= Non Valley =

Valley in northern Italy

Coordinates: 46°22′N 11°02′E

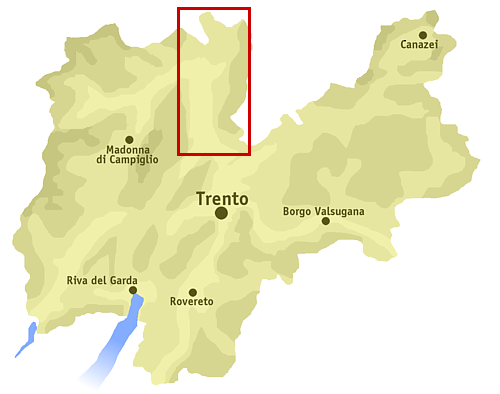
Map of Trentino with Non Valley marked in red.

The Non Valley (Italian: Val di Non or Valle di Non; Nones: Val de Nòn; German: Nonstal; Latin: Anaunia) is a valley mainly in the Trentino. Moreover, the Deutsch Nonsberg (also known as simply Nonsberg, Alta Val di Non in italian), a subregion, consists of three primarily German-speaking municipalities in the province of South Tyrol, Northern Italy.

The most populous municipalities in the valley are Cles (the main town), Predaia, Ville d'Anaunia, Novella and Borgo d'Anaunia.

There are a total of 23 municipalities (comune):

- Amblar-Don
- Borgo d'Anaunia
- Bresimo
- Campodenno
- Cavareno
- Cis
- Cles
- Contà
- Dambel
- Denno
- Livo
- Novella
- Predaia
- Romeno
- Ronzone
- Ruffrè-Mendola
- Rumo
- Sanzeno
- Sarnonico
- Sfruz
- Sporminore
- Ton
- Ville d'Anaunia

The German-speaking Deutschnonsberg municipalities are:

- Laurein
- Proveis
- Unsere Liebe Frau im Walde-St. Felix

The latter comune is connected to the rest of its province by the Gampenpass, while the other two are accessible through a tunnel under the Hofmahdjoch from the rest of South Tyrol since 1998.

The Nones language is named after and spoken in the valley.

== See also ==
- The Hidden Frontier, an ethnographic work
