= Novella, Trentino =

Novella
- Comune
- Comune di Novella
- Location within Italy Location within Trentino-Alto Adige/Südtirol
- Coordinates: 46°23′28″N 11°3′30″E
- Country: Italy
- Region: Trentino-Alto Adige/Südtirol
- Province: Trentino (TN)
- Frazioni: Arsio, Brez, Cagnò, Carnalez, Cloz, Frari, Revò, Rivo, Romallo, Salobbi, Traversara, Tregiovo

Government
  - Mayor: Silvano Dominici

Area
  - Total: 46.59 km^{2} (17.99 sq mi)
- Elevation: 724 m (2,375 ft)
- Highest elevation: 1,923 m (6,309 ft)
- Lowest elevation: 527 m (1,729 ft)

Population (2026)
  - Total: 3,581
  - Density: 76.86/km^{2} (199.1/sq mi)
- Time zone: UTC+1 (CET)
  - Summer (DST): UTC+2 (CEST)
- Postal code: 38028
- Dialing code: 0463
- ISTAT code: 022253
- Website: Official website

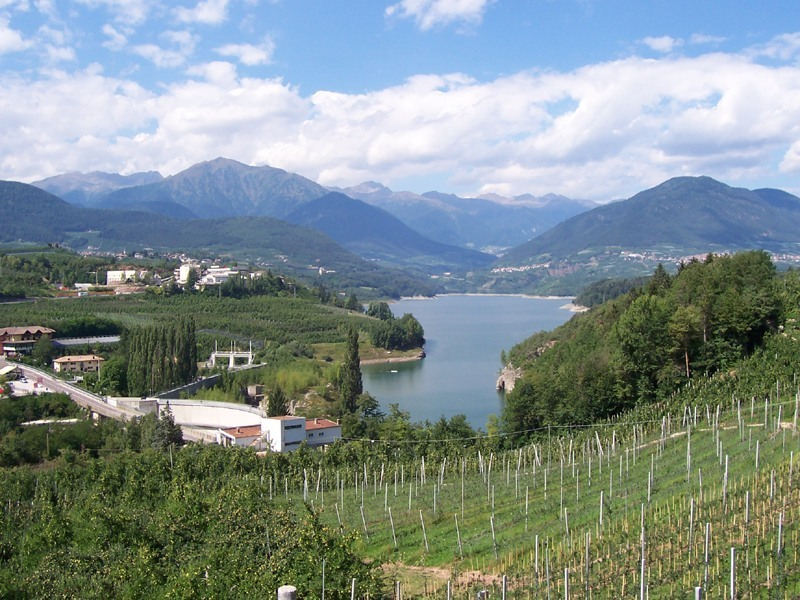
A view Lake of St. Justina

Novella is a comune in Trentino, a province of the northern Italian region Trentino-Alto Adige/Südtirol. It was established on 1 January 2020 after the fusion of the five municipalities of Brez, Cagnò, Cloz, Revò and Romallo.
