= Dambel =

- Comune
- Comune di Dambel
- Location within Italy Location within Trentino-Alto Adige/Südtirol
- Coordinates: 46°24′N 11°6′E
- Country: Italy
- Region: Trentino-Alto Adige/Südtirol
- Province: Trentino (TN)

Government
  - Mayor: Andrea Pollo

Area
  - Total: 5.1 km^{2} (2.0 sq mi)
- Elevation: 750 m (2,460 ft)

Population (2026)
  - Total: 391
  - Density: 77/km^{2} (200/sq mi)
- Demonym: Dambellesi
- Time zone: UTC+1 (CET)
  - Summer (DST): UTC+2 (CEST)
- Postal code: 38010
- Dialing code: 0463
- Patron saint: Santa Maria Assunta
- Saint day: August 15
- Website: Official website

Dambel (Nones: Dambel; Latin: Ambulum) is a comune (municipality) in Trentino in the northern Italian region Trentino-Alto Adige/Südtirol, located about 35 kilometres (22 mi) north of the city of Trento.

Dambel is located in the Val di Non at an elevation of 750 metres (2,460 ft). It is on the provincial highway between Sanzeno to the south and Sarnonico to the north. The town's name derives from the Latin word ambulum because it was at a historical crossroads on the commercial road between Lombardy and Germany, which crossed through Dambel and over the Novella River at the Pozzena bridge. Today the economy of Dambel is concentrated on the production of apples.

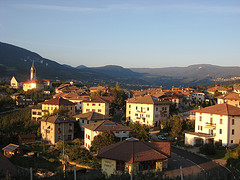
The town of Dambel

== Geography ==
As of 31 December 2004, it had a population of 436 and an area of 5.1 square kilometres (2.0 mi^{2}).

Dambel borders the following municipalities: Brez, Sarnonico, Cloz, Romallo, Romeno and Sanzeno.

== Demographic evolution ==
Historical population

Year	Pop.	±%
1861	?	—
1871	?	—
1881	?	—
1901	?	—
1911	?	—

Year	Pop.	±%
1921	718	—
1931	649	−9.6%
1936	615	−5.2%
1951	607	−1.3%
1961	535	−11.9%

Year	Pop.	±%
1971	527	−1.5%
1981	468	−11.2%
1991	432	−7.7%
2001	424	−1.9%
2004	436	+2.8%

Source: Data from ISTAT
