= Revò =

- Comune
- Comune di Revò
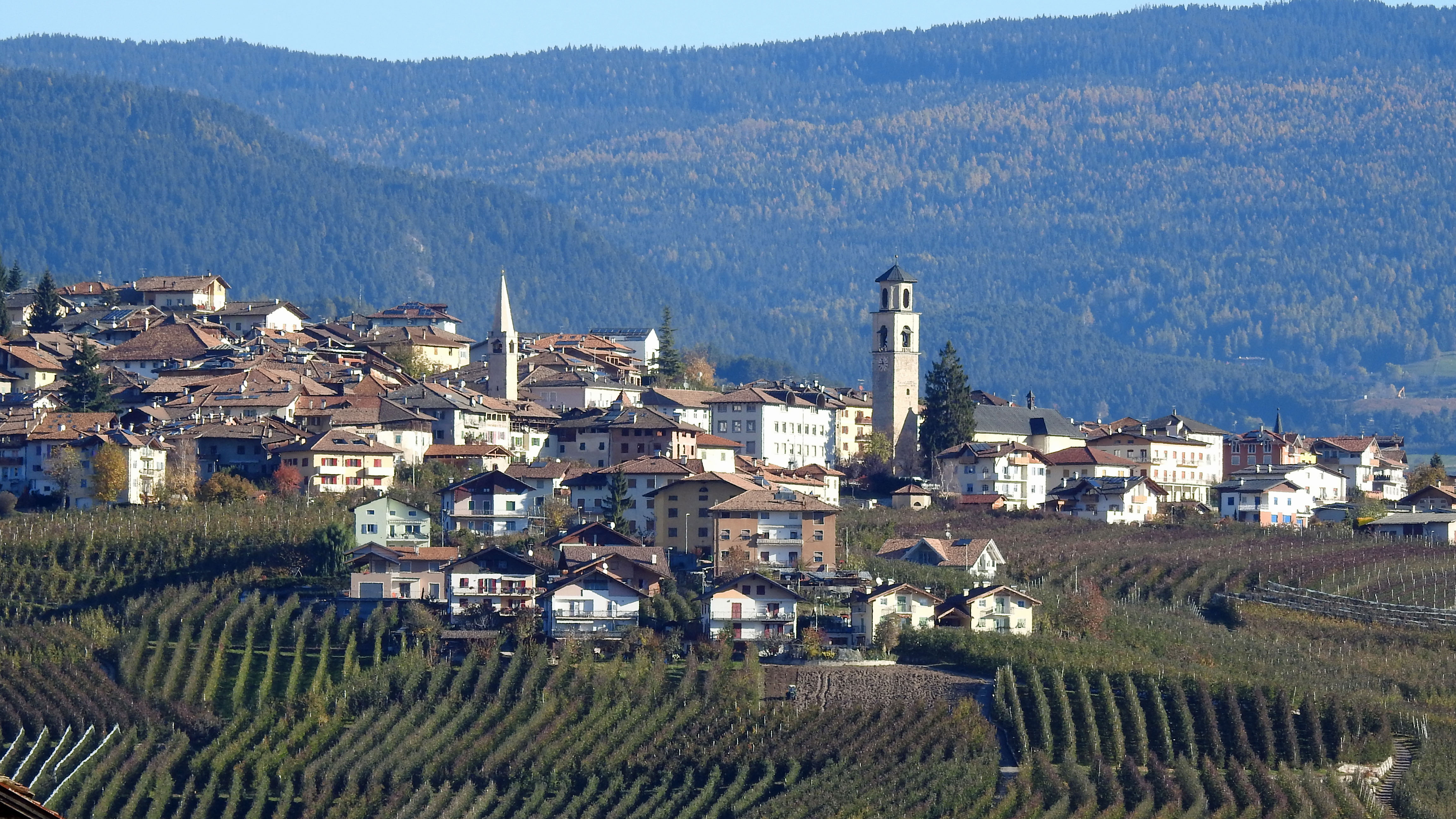
- Revò and the church of Santo Stefano

- Location within Italy Location within Trentino-Alto Adige/Südtirol
- Coordinates: 46°23′28″N 11°3′30″E
- Country: Italy
- Region: Trentino-Alto Adige/Südtirol
- Province: Trentino (TN)
- Frazioni: Tregiovo

Government
  - Mayor: Yvette Maccani

Area
  - Total: 13.4 km^{2} (5.2 sq mi)
- Elevation: 729 m (2,392 ft)

Population (Dec. 2004)
  - Total: 1,233
  - Density: 92.0/km^{2} (238/sq mi)
- Demonym: Revodani
- Time zone: UTC+1 (CET)
  - Summer (DST): UTC+2 (CEST)
- Postal code: 38028
- Dialing code: 0463
- Patron saint: Saint Stephen
- Saint day: December 26
- Website: Official website

Revò (Nones: Rvòu or Ruòu) is a comune (municipality) in Trentino in the northern Italian region Trentino-Alto Adige/Südtirol, located about 35 kilometres (22 mi) north of Trento.

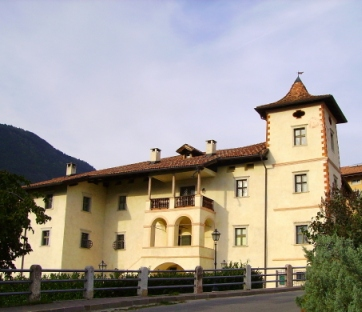
Campia house of Revò

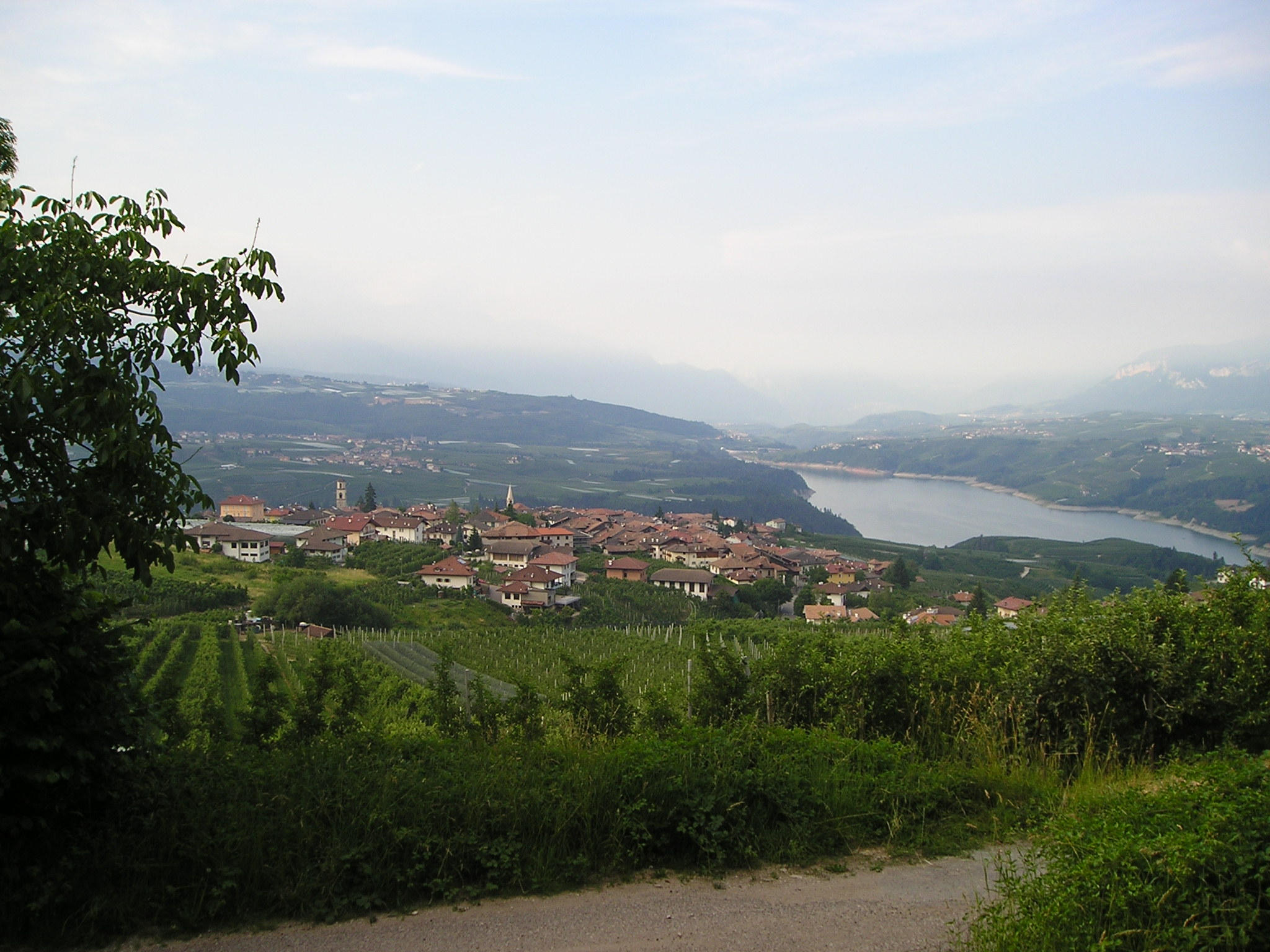
Revò and Lago di Santa Giustina

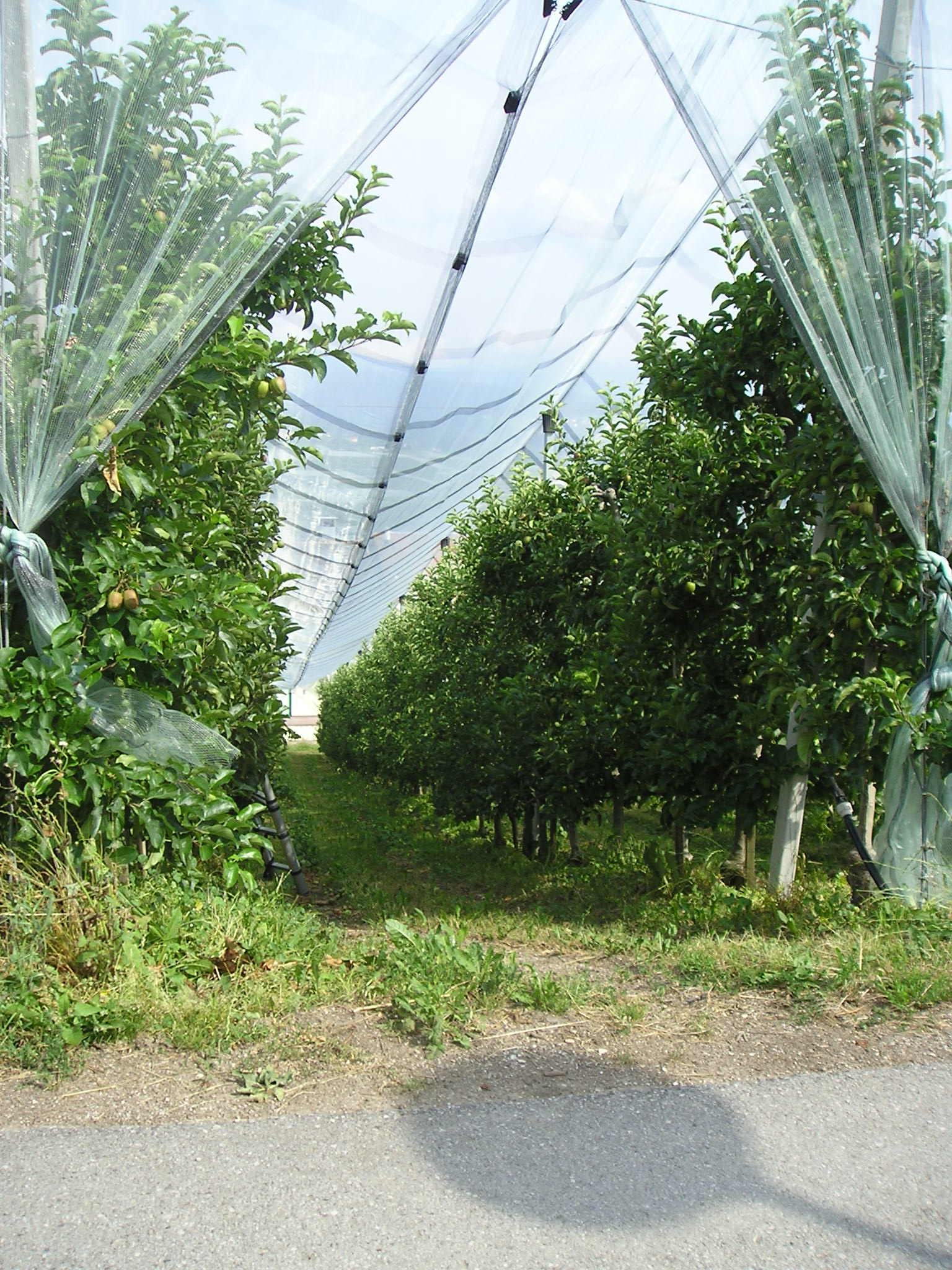
Apple cultivation showing the netting used to protect the crop

== Geography ==
Revò is situated on a grassy plain in the Val di Non, overlooking Lake Santa Giustina, that had already been settled by the 3rd century BC. It is backed by Monte Ozol, in the Maddalene mountain range, which is topped by an iron-age hill fort. The parish church of Santo Stefano dates back to at least 1128 AD and has a fine spire. The church of St Mary dates from the 18th century and has an octagonal spire. Other notable buildings include the Villa Campia-Maffei and the Casa Thun. Nearby, the River Sass has carved a narrow but deep canyon through the rock and visitors can walk along the trails and walkways that traverse the vertical-sided gorge in the "Parco Fluviale Novella".

The municipality of Revò contains the frazione (subdivision) Tregiovo. Revò borders the following municipalities: Cagnò, Cles, Cloz, Romallo, Rumo, Sanzeno, and Laurein.

== Economy ==
At one time, grapes were the main crop grown in the area, particularly the variety "Groppello," which dates back to the 17th century and from which a local wine was made. Nowadays, the economy of the region is very dependent on the production of apples, in particular the variety Golden Delicious. A large proportion of the orchards are protected from bird damage to the crop by netting which is tied back during much of the year. Over 5,000 farmers in the area are members of the Melinda cooperative, a consortium of apple growers in the Val di Non and Val di Sole, which undertakes quality control and markets the apples on their behalf under the trade name "Melinda".

== Demography ==
As of 31 December 2004, Revò had a population of 1,233 and an area of 13.4 square kilometres (5.2 mi^{2}).

Historical population

Year	Pop.	±%
1861	?	—
1871	?	—
1881	?	—
1901	?	—
1911	?	—

Year	Pop.	±%
1921	1,506	—
1931	1,336	−11.3%
1936	1,372	+2.7%
1951	1,448	+5.5%
1961	1,260	−13.0%

Year	Pop.	±%
1971	1,211	−3.9%
1981	1,163	−4.0%
1991	1,166	+0.3%
2001	1,207	+3.5%

Source: Data from ISTAT
