= Cagnò =

- Comune
- Comune di Cagnò
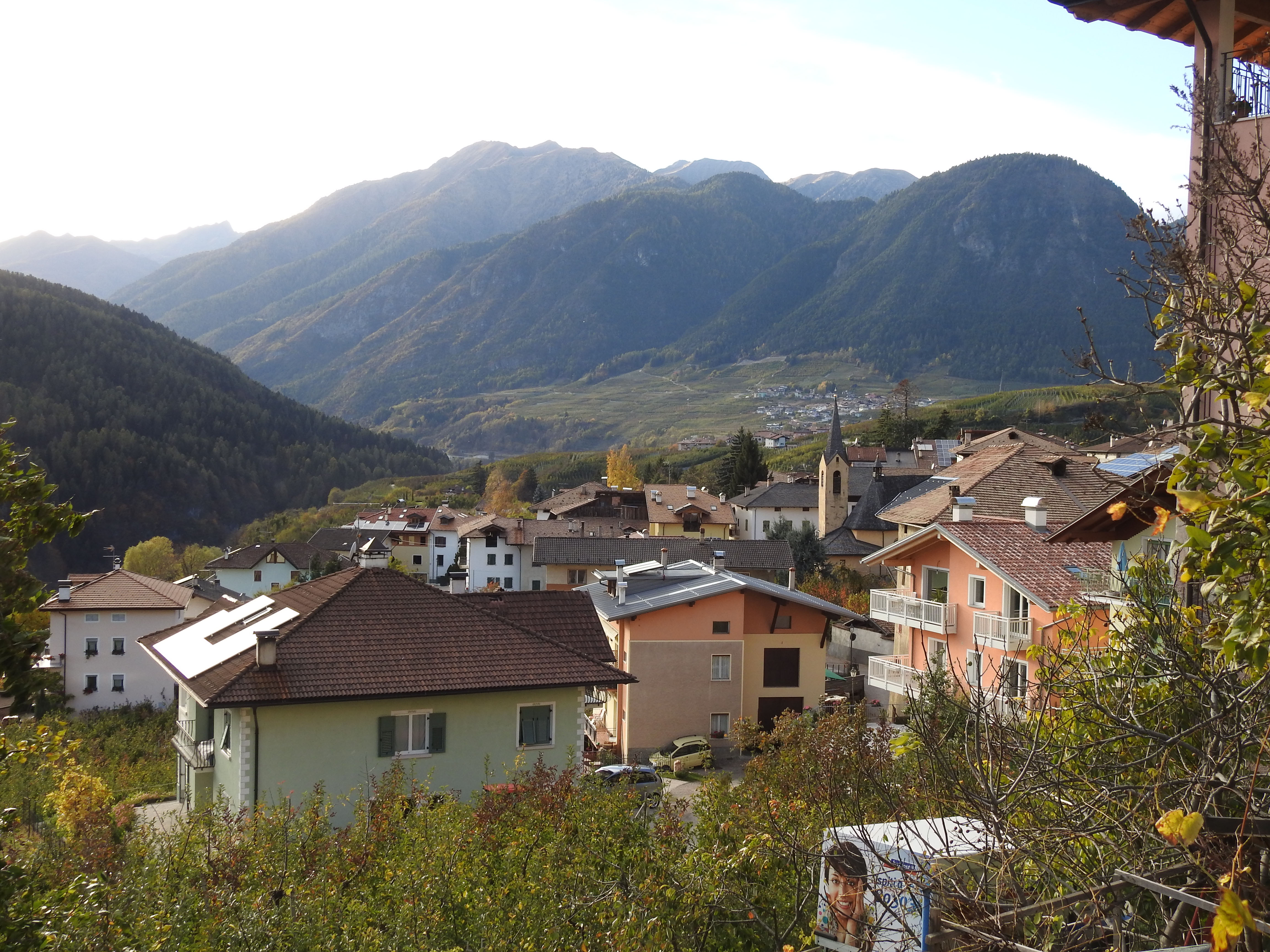

- Location within Italy Location within Trentino-Alto Adige/Südtirol
- Coordinates: 46°23′38″N 11°2′30″E
- Country: Italy
- Region: Trentino-Alto Adige/Südtirol
- Province: Trentino (TN)

Area
  - Total: 3.3 km^{2} (1.3 sq mi)
- Elevation: 670 m (2,200 ft)

Population (Dec. 2004)
  - Total: 378
  - Density: 110/km^{2} (300/sq mi)
- Demonym: Cagnesi or cagnodani
- Time zone: UTC+1 (CET)
  - Summer (DST): UTC+2 (CEST)
- Postal code: 38028
- Dialing code: 0463

Cagnò (Nones: Ciagnòu or Cignòu) is a comune (municipality) in Trentino in the northern Italian region Trentino-Alto Adige/Südtirol, located about 35 kilometres (22 mi) north of Trento. As of 31 December 2004, it had a population of 378 and an area of 3.3 square kilometres (1.3 mi^{2}).

Cagnò borders the following municipalities: Laurein, Proveis, Rumo, Revò, Livo, and Cles.

== Demographic evolution ==
Historical population

Year	Pop.	±%
1861	?	—
1871	?	—
1881	?	—
1901	?	—
1911	?	—

Year	Pop.	±%
1921	465	—
1931	398	−14.4%
1936	406	+2.0%
1951	438	+7.9%
1961	430	−1.8%

Year	Pop.	±%
1971	384	−10.7%
1981	380	−1.0%
1991	346	−8.9%
2001	369	+6.6%

Source: Data from ISTAT
