= Sanzeno =

- Comune
- Comune di Sanzeno
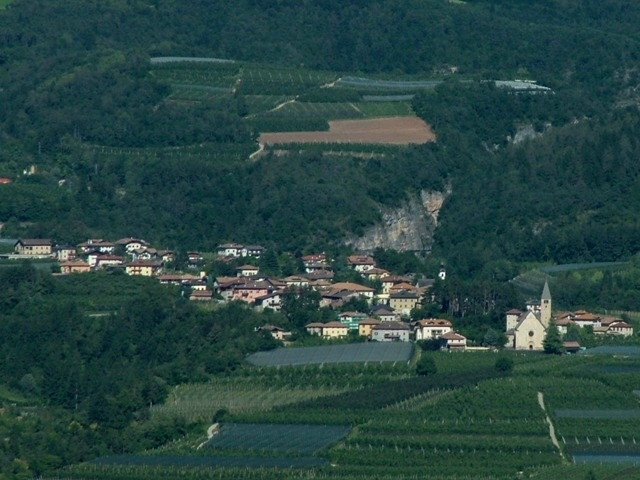

- Location within Italy Location within Trentino-Alto Adige/Südtirol
- Coordinates: 46°22′N 11°4′E
- Country: Italy
- Region: Trentino-Alto Adige/Südtirol
- Province: Trentino (TN)
- Frazioni: Banco, Casez, Piano

Government
  - Mayor: Martin Slaifer Ziller

Area
  - Total: 8.0 km^{2} (3.1 sq mi)
- Elevation: 641 m (2,103 ft)

Population (Dec. 2004)
  - Total: 948
  - Density: 120/km^{2} (310/sq mi)
- Demonym: Sanzenesi
- Time zone: UTC+1 (CET)
  - Summer (DST): UTC+2 (CEST)
- Postal code: 38010
- Dialing code: 0463
- Website: Official website

Sanzeno (Italian: [sanˈdzeːno], Nones: Sanzén) is a comune (municipality) in Trentino in the northern Italian region Trentino-Alto Adige/Südtirol, located about 35 kilometres (22 mi) north of Trento. As of 31 December 2004, it had a population of 948 and an area of 8.0 square kilometres (3.1 mi^{2}).

== Geography ==
The municipality of Sanzeno contains the frazioni (subdivisions, mainly villages and hamlets) of Banco, Casez and Piano.

Sanzeno borders the following municipalities: Cles, Coredo, Dambel, Revò, Romallo, Romeno, Taio and Tassullo.

== Gallery ==
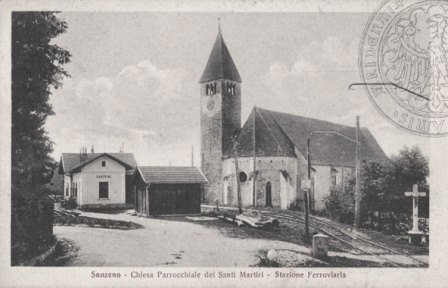
The Station

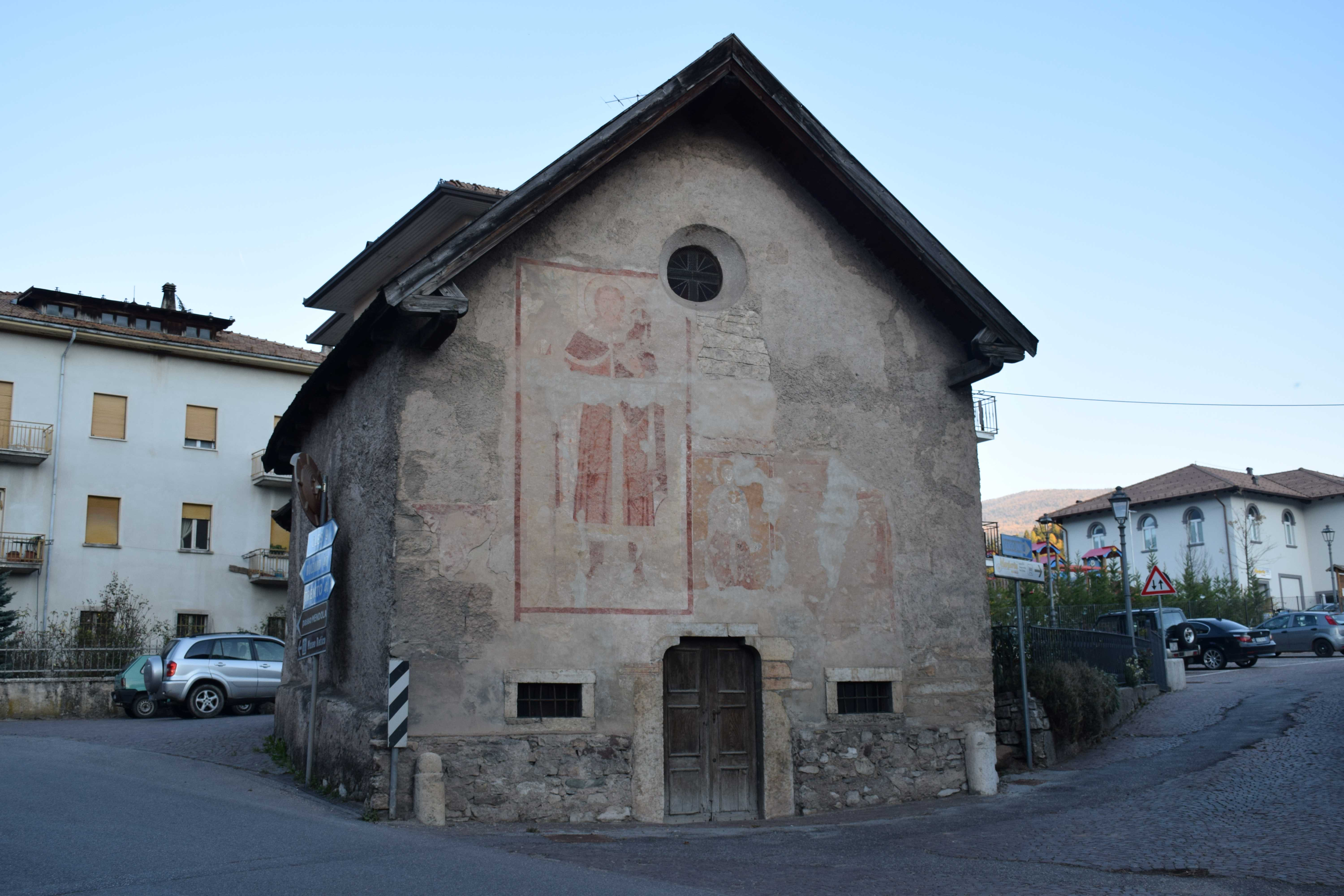
Saint Alexander church

== Demographic evolution ==
Historical population

Year	Pop.	±%
1861	?	—
1871	?	—
1881	?	—
1901	?	—
1911	?	—

Year	Pop.	±%
1921	921	—
1931	861	−6.5%
1936	807	−6.3%
1951	868	+7.6%
1961	870	+0.2%

Year	Pop.	±%
1971	828	−4.8%
1981	866	+4.6%
1991	897	+3.6%
2001	906	+1.0%

Source: Data from ISTAT

== See also ==
- São Romédio Community
