= Kaltern an der Weinstraße =

- Comune
- Marktgemeinde Kaltern an der Weinstraße; Comune di Caldaro sulla Strada del Vino
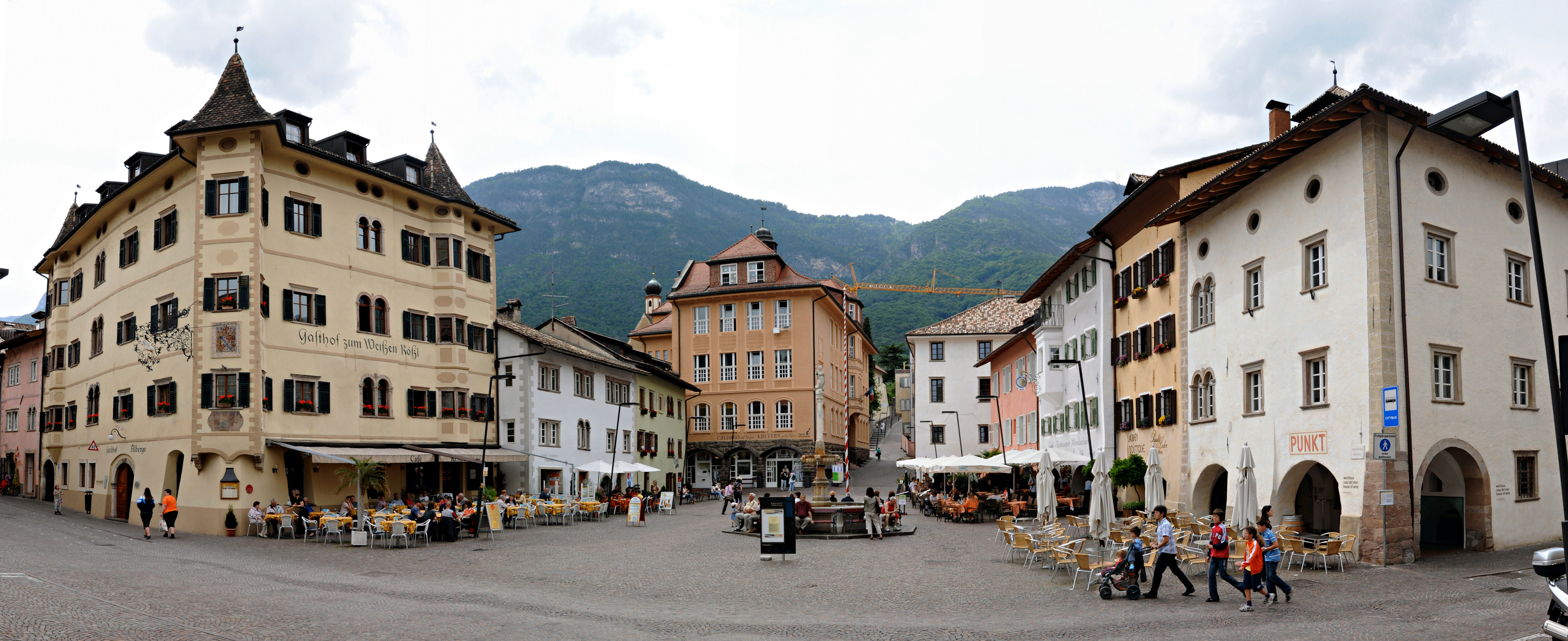
- General view of Kaltern's Marktplatz ("market square")

- Coat of arms

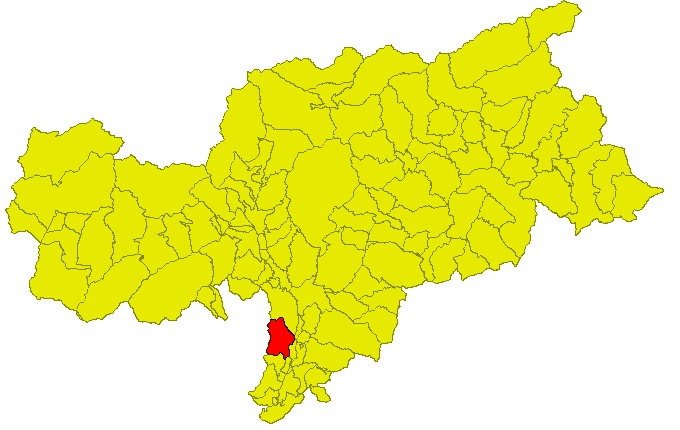
- The municipal area

- Location within Italy Location within Trentino-Alto Adige/Südtirol
- Coordinates: 46°25′N 11°15′E
- Country: Italy
- Region: Trentino-Alto Adige/Südtirol
- Province: South Tyrol (BZ)
- Frazioni: Altenburg (Castelvecchio), Oberplanitzing (Pianizza di Sopra), Unterplanitzing (Pianizza di Sotto), St. Josef am See (San Giuseppe al Lago), St. Anton/Pfuss (San Antonio/Pozzo), St. Nikolaus (San Nicoló) and Mitterdorf (Villa di Mezzo)

Government
  - Mayor: Christoph Pillon (Südtiroler Volkspartei)

Area
  - Total: 47.9 km^{2} (18.5 sq mi)
- Elevation: 425 m (1,394 ft)

Population (Nov. 2010)
  - Total: 7,592
  - Density: 158/km^{2} (411/sq mi)
- Demonym(s): German: Kalterer; Italian: caldaresi
- Time zone: UTC+1 (CET)
  - Summer (DST): UTC+2 (CEST)
- Postal code: 39052
- Dialing code: 0471
- Website: Official website

Kaltern an der Weinstraße (Austrian German: [ˈkaltɐn an deːɐ̯ ˈvaɪnˌʃtraːsɛ]; Italian: Caldaro sulla Strada del Vino [kalˈdaːro sulla ˈstraːda del ˈviːno]), often abbreviated to Kaltern or Caldaro, is a municipality and a village in South Tyrol in northern Italy. It is about 12 kilometres (7 mi) southwest of the city of Bolzano.

== Geography ==
As of 30 November 2010, it had a population of 7,592 and an area of 47.9 square kilometres (18.5 mi^{2}).

It is famous for its lake, the Kalterer See, and wine (Kalterersee Auslese or Lago di Caldaro scelto). The cuisine combines Italian and Tyrolean styles. The nearby Dolomites area is known for its hiking and climbing routes.

Kaltern borders the following municipalities: Eppan, Neumarkt, Tramin, Vadena, Amblar, Cavareno, Ruffrè-Mendola, and Sarnonico (the last four municipalities belong to the Trentino).

=== Frazioni ===
The municipality of Kaltern contains the frazioni (subdivisions, mainly villages and hamlets) Altenburg (Castelvecchio), Oberplanitzing (Pianizza di Sopra), Unterplanitzing (Pianizza di Sotto), St. Josef am See (San Giuseppe al Lago), St. Anton/Pfuss (San Antonio/Pozzo), St. Nikolaus (San Nicoló) and Mitterdorf (Villa di Mezzo).

== History ==
=== Coat-of-arms ===
The coat of arms, used by the end of the 16th century, is a copper kettle with a handle on argent background.

== Society ==
=== Linguistic distribution ===
According to the 2024 census, 91.55% of the population speak German, 7.93% Italian and 0.51% Ladin as first language.

=== Demographic evolution ===
Historical population

Year	Pop.	±%
1860	?	—
1870	?	—
1880	3,760	—
1900	?	—
1910	5,098	—

Year	Pop.	±%
1921	5,043	−1.1%
1931	5,188	+2.9%
1936	4,957	−4.5%
1951	5,028	+1.4%
1961	5,108	+1.6%

Year	Pop.	±%
1971	5,416	+6.0%
1981	5,727	+5.7%
1991	6,337	+10.7%
2001	6,852	+8.1%

Source: Data from ISTAT & ASTAT

== Twin towns ==
Kaltern an der Weinstraße is twinned with:

- Heppenheim, Germany (1971)

== Notable residents ==
- Manfred Fuchs (1938 in Latsch – 2014 in Kaltern) a German entrepreneur and space pioneer
- Andreas Seppi (born 1984) an Italian professional tennis player

== Picture gallery ==
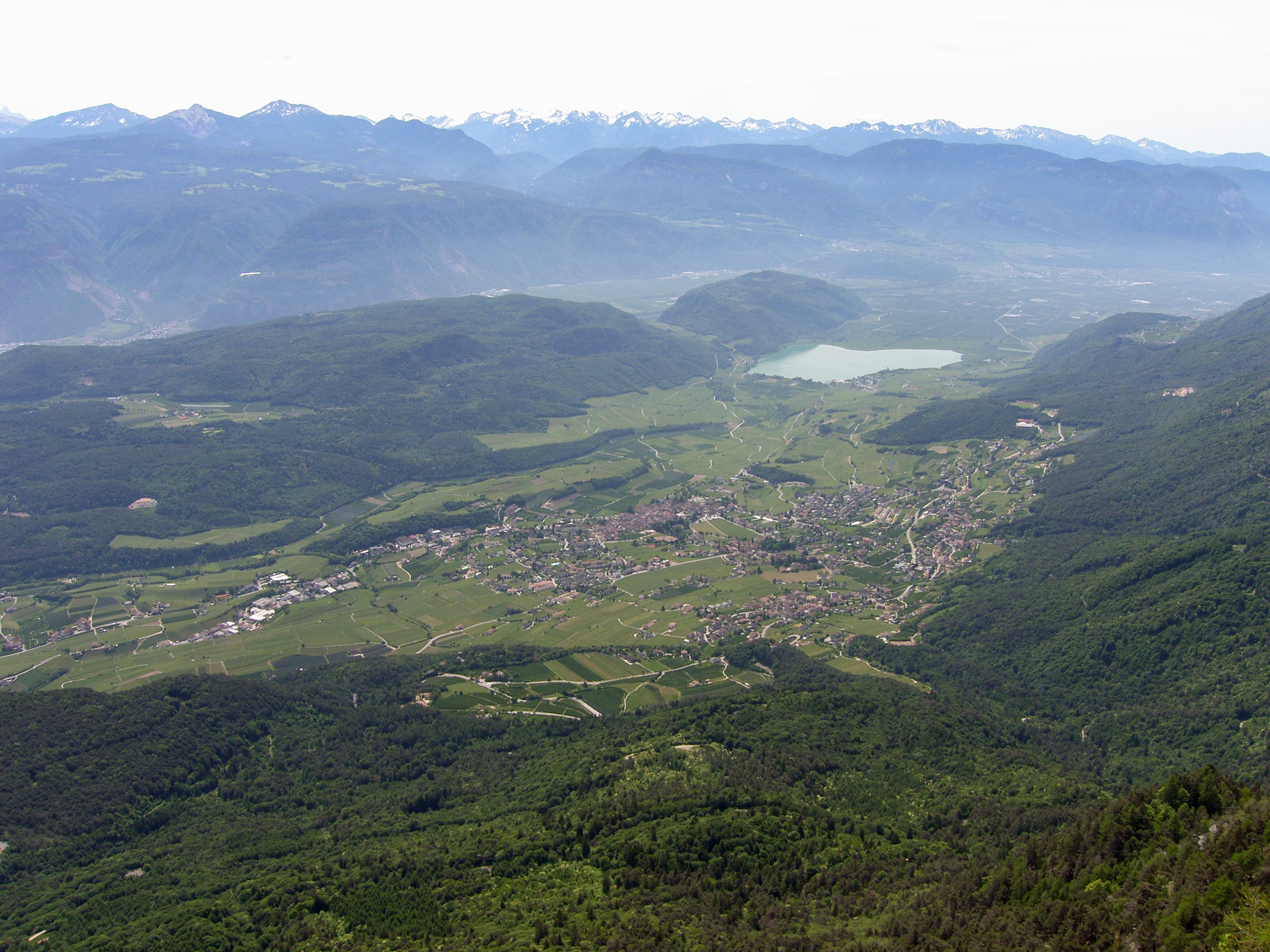
Panorama of Kaltern from the Penegal

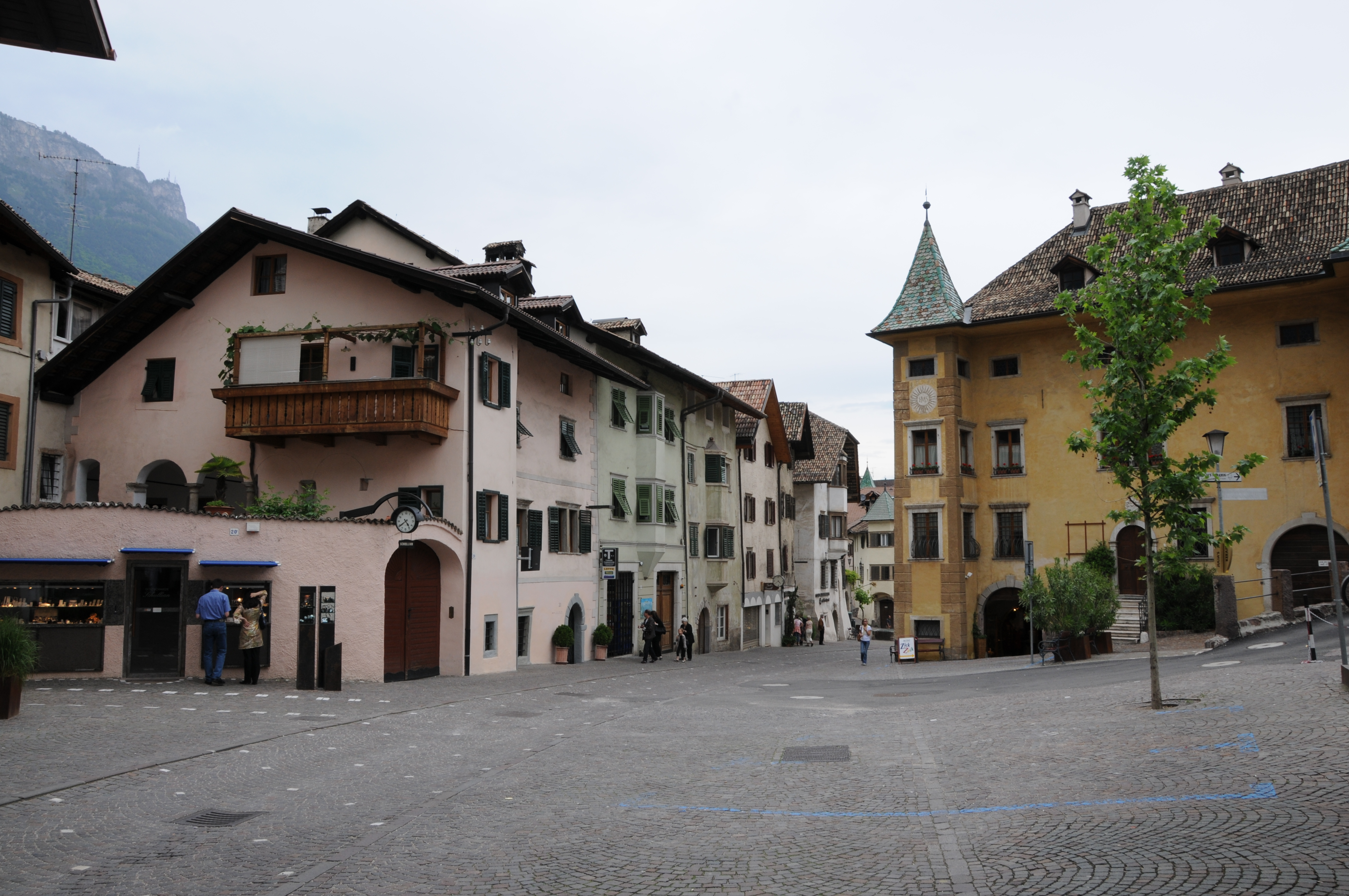
Kaltern, town center

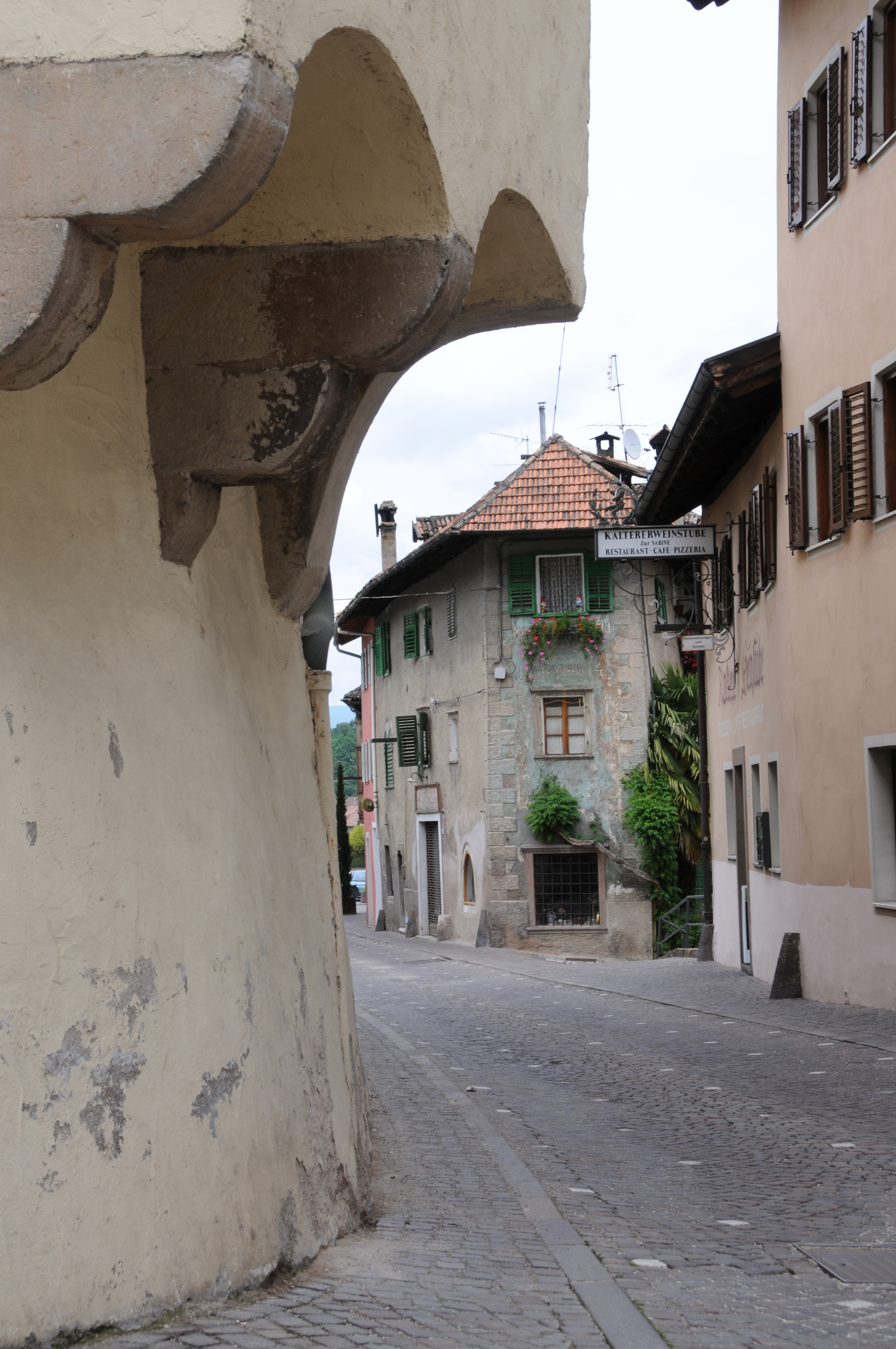
Kaltern, town center

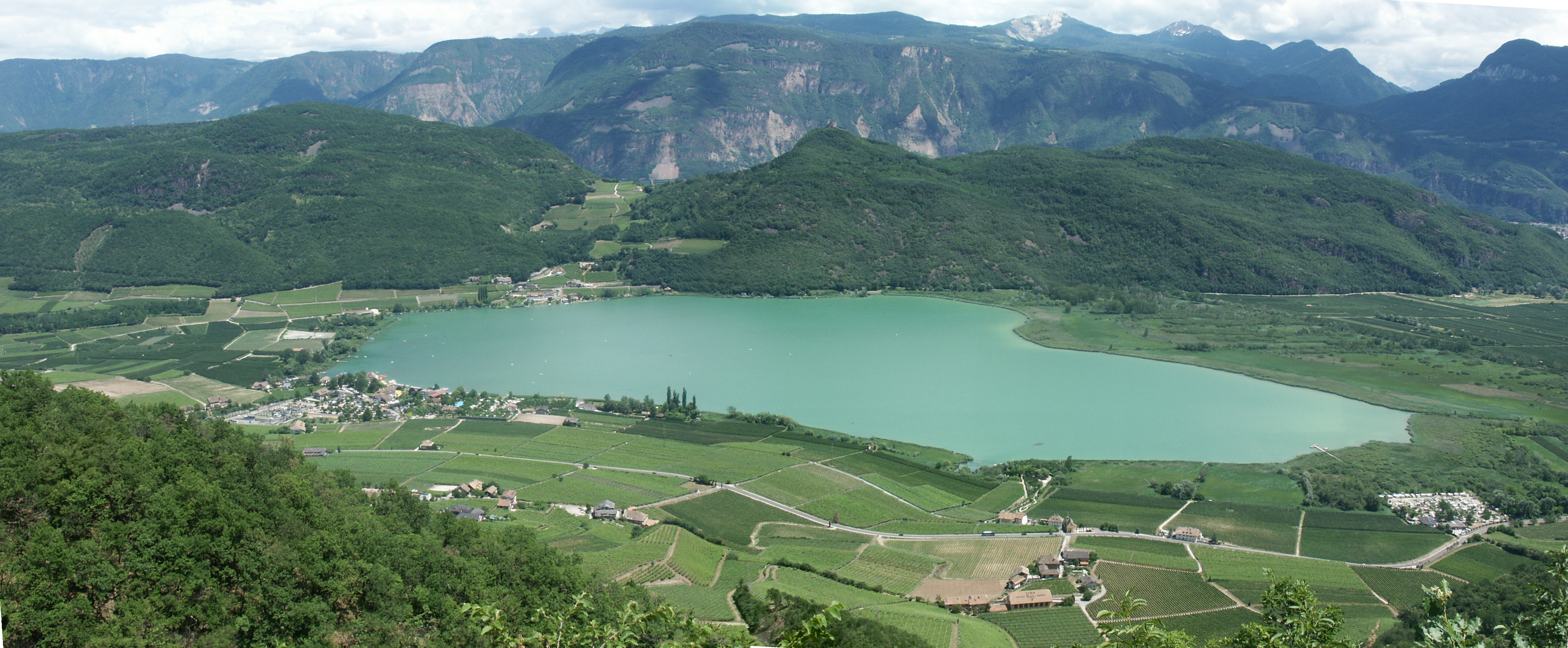
The Kalterer See (lake of Kaltern)
