= Romeno =

- Comune
- Comune di Romeno
- Location within Italy Location within Trentino-Alto Adige/Südtirol
- Coordinates: 46°24′N 11°7′E
- Country: Italy
- Region: Trentino-Alto Adige/Südtirol
- Province: Trentino (TN)
- Frazioni: Malgolo, Salter

Government
  - Mayor: Luca Fattor

Area
  - Total: 9.1 km^{2} (3.5 sq mi)
- Elevation: 962 m (3,156 ft)

Population (Dec. 2004)
  - Total: 1,315
  - Density: 140/km^{2} (370/sq mi)
- Demonym: Romenesi
- Time zone: UTC+1 (CET)
  - Summer (DST): UTC+2 (CEST)
- Postal code: 38010
- Dialing code: 0463
- Website: Official website

Romeno (Romén in local dialect) is a comune (municipality) in Trentino in the northern Italian region Trentino-Alto Adige/Südtirol, located about 35 kilometres (22 mi) north of Trento.

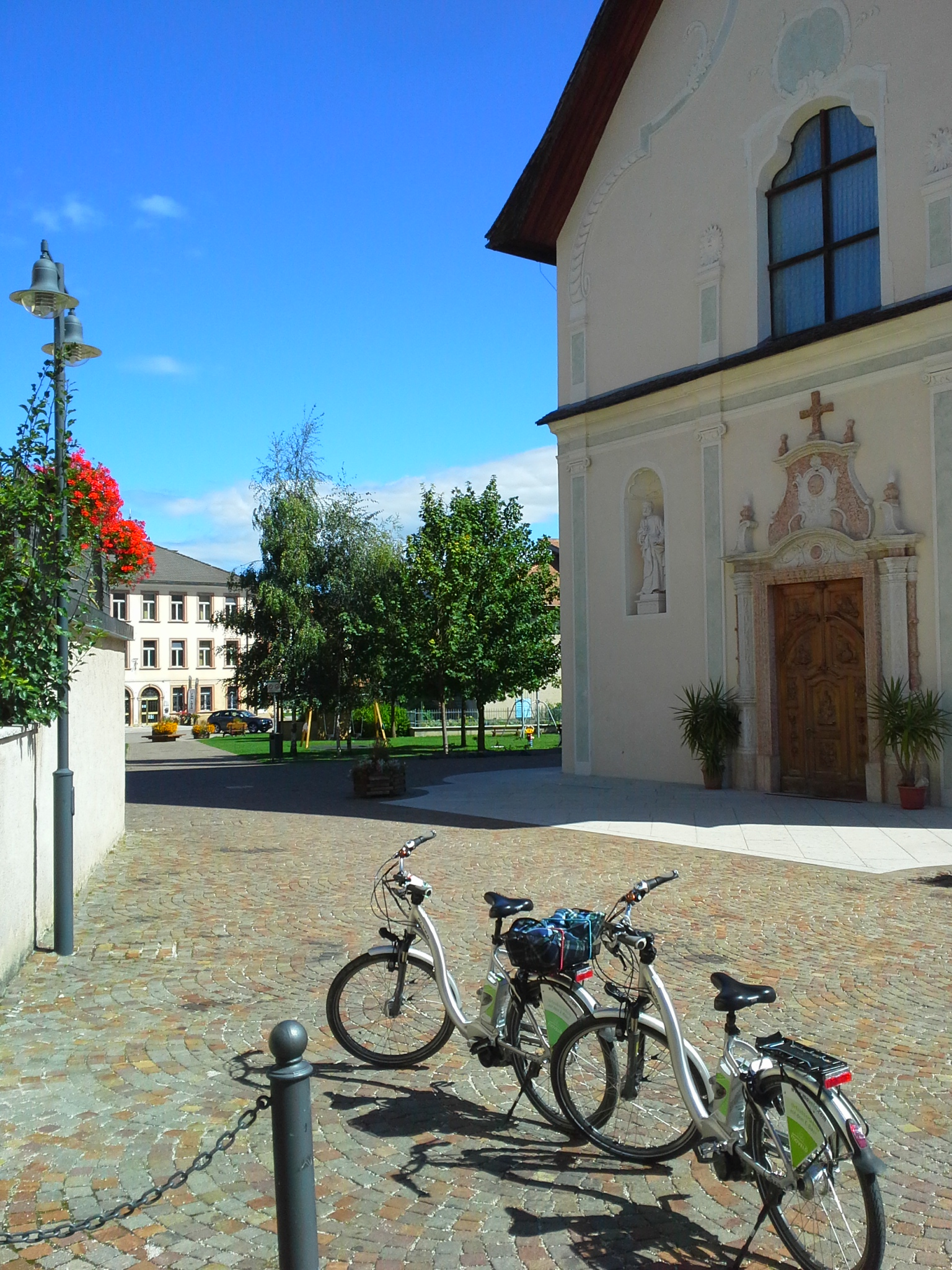
Piazza Padre Luigi Graiff

== Geography ==
As of 31 December 2004, it had a population of 1,315 and an area of 9.1 square kilometres (3.5 mi^{2}).

Romeno borders the following municipalities: Amblar, Cavareno, Coredo, Dambel, Don, Sanzeno and Sarnonico.

=== Frazioni ===
The municipality of Romeno contains the frazioni (subdivisions, mainly villages and hamlets) Malgolo and Salter.

== Demographic evolution ==
Historical population

Year	Pop.	±%
1861	?	—
1871	?	—
1881	?	—
1901	?	—
1911	?	—

Year	Pop.	±%
1921	1,382	—
1931	1,339	−3.1%
1936	1,237	−7.6%
1951	1,273	+2.9%
1961	1,310	+2.9%

Year	Pop.	±%
1971	1,214	−7.3%
1981	1,187	−2.2%
1991	1,181	−0.5%
2001	1,243	+5.2%

Source: Data from ISTAT
