= Brez, Trentino =

Brez Breć (Ladin)
- Comune
- Comune di Brez
- Coat of arms

- Location within Italy Location within Trentino-Alto Adige/Südtirol
- Coordinates: 46°26′N 11°6′E
- Country: Italy
- Region: Trentino-Alto Adige/Südtirol
- Province: Trentino (TN)

Government
  - Mayor: Mario Menghini

Area
  - Total: 18.9 km^{2} (7.3 sq mi)
- Elevation: 792 m (2,598 ft)

Population (Dec. 2004)
  - Total: 801
  - Density: 42.4/km^{2} (110/sq mi)
- Time zone: UTC+1 (CET)
  - Summer (DST): UTC+2 (CEST)
- Postal code: 38021
- Dialing code: 0463
- Website: Official website

Brez (Italian: [ˈbrets]; Nones: Breć; German: Bretz or Britsch) was a comune (municipality) in Trentino in the northern Italian region Trentino-Alto Adige/Südtirol, located about 40 kilometres (25 mi) north of Trento.

== Geography ==
As of 31 December 2006, it had a population of 801 and an area of 18.9 square kilometres (7.3 mi^{2}).

Brez borders the following municipalities: Castelfondo, Cloz, Dambel, Fondo, Sarnonico, and Laurein.

== Demographic evolution ==
Historical population

Year	Pop.	±%
1861	?	—
1871	?	—
1881	?	—
1901	?	—
1911	?	—

Year	Pop.	±%
1921	1,664	—
1931	1,117	−32.9%
1936	1,100	−1.5%
1951	1,157	+5.2%
1961	1,100	−4.9%

Year	Pop.	±%
1971	911	−17.2%
1981	800	−12.2%
1991	747	−6.6%
2001	739	−1.1%

Source: Data from ISTAT
