= Kalterer See =

Lake in South Tyrol, Italy

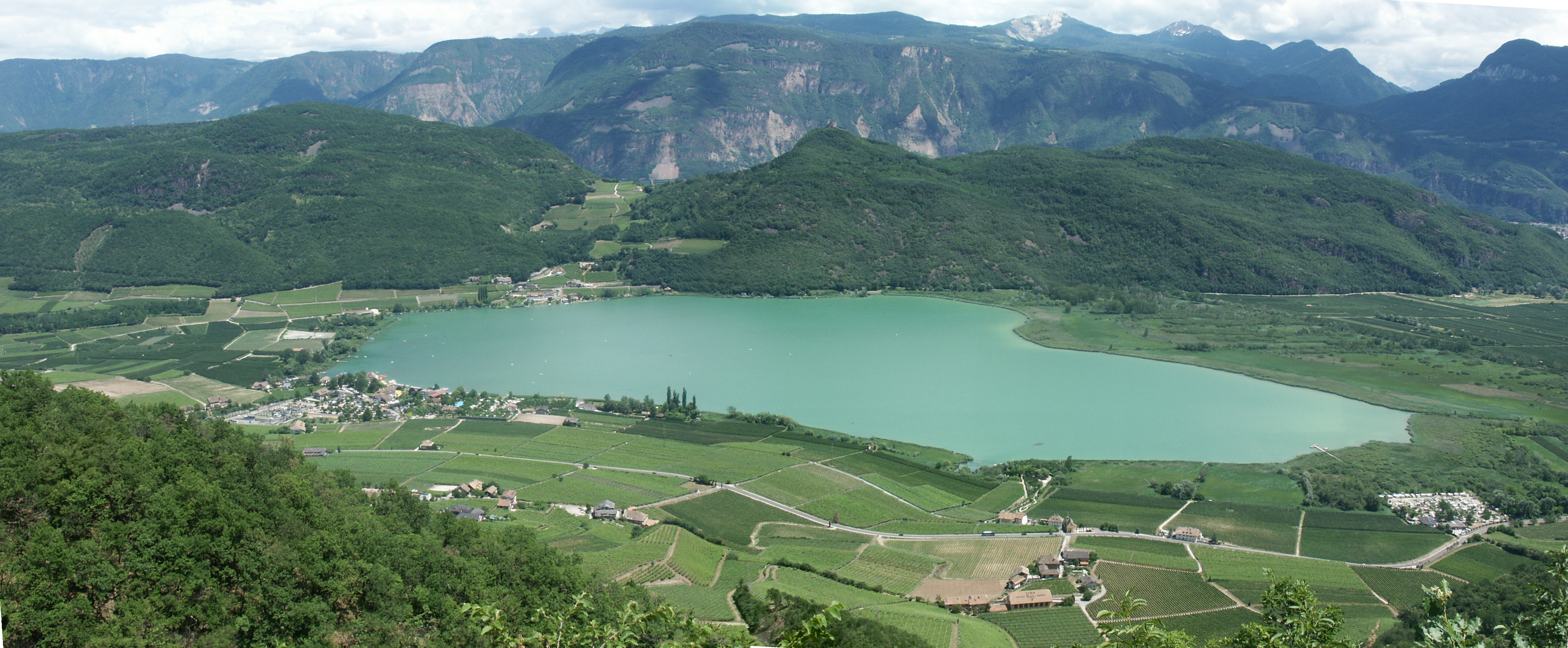
- View from Altenburg (Kaltern) (Castelvecchio)

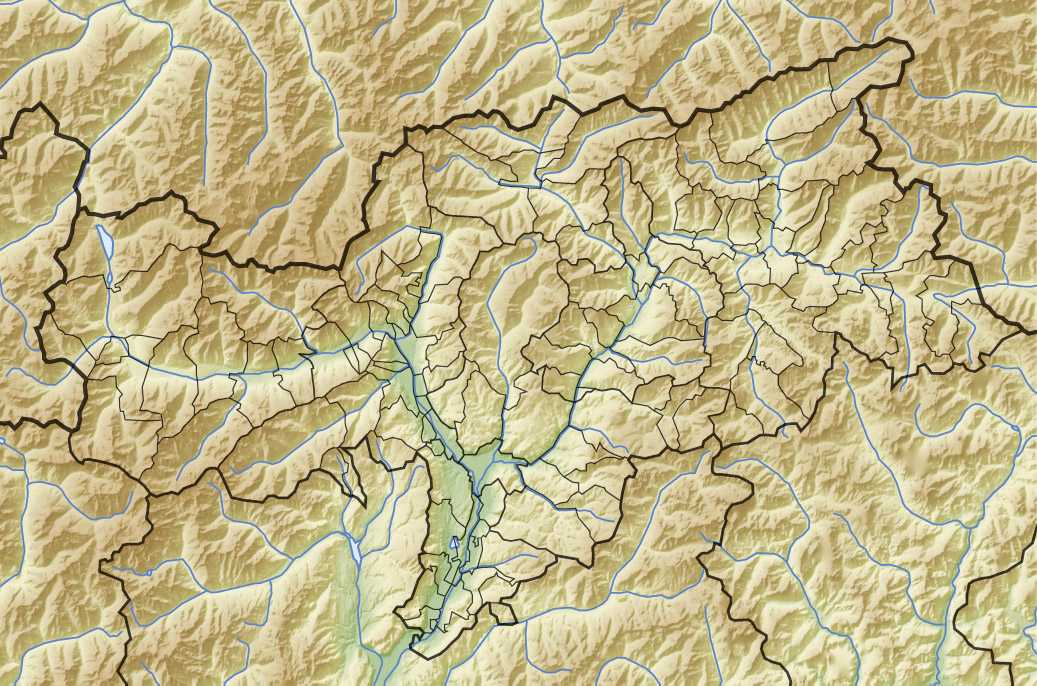
- Location within South Tyrol
- Location: South Tyrol
- Coordinates: 46°22′39″N 11°15′45″E
- Catchment area: 55.5 km^{2} (21.4 sq mi)
- Basin countries: Italy
- Max. length: 1.8 km (1.1 mi)
- Max. width: 0.9 km (0.56 mi)
- Surface area: 1.4 km^{2} (0.54 sq mi)
- Average depth: 3.5 m (11 ft)
- Max. depth: 5.6 m (18 ft)
- Water volume: 6×10^{6} m^{3} (210×10^{6} cu ft)
- Shore length^{1}: 5.3 km (3.3 mi)
- Surface elevation: 216 m (709 ft)
- Settlements: Kaltern
- ^{1} Shore length is not a well-defined measure.

Lake Kaltern (Italian: Lago di Caldaro; German: Kalterer See) is a lake in the municipality of Kaltern in South Tyrol, Italy.
