= Cloz =

- Comune
- Comune di Cloz
- Location within Italy Location within Trentino-Alto Adige/Südtirol
- Coordinates: 46°25′N 11°5′E
- Country: Italy
- Region: Trentino-Alto Adige/Südtirol
- Province: Trentino (TN)

Area
  - Total: 8.3 km^{2} (3.2 sq mi)
- Elevation: 792 m (2,598 ft)

Population (Dec. 2004)
  - Total: 710
  - Density: 86/km^{2} (220/sq mi)
- Demonym: Cloziani
- Time zone: UTC+1 (CET)
  - Summer (DST): UTC+2 (CEST)
- Postal code: 38020
- Dialing code: 0463
- Website: Official website

Cloz (Nones: Clòuz) is a comune (municipality) in Trentino in the northern Italian region Trentino-Alto Adige/Südtirol, located about 40 kilometres (25 mi) north of Trento.

== Geography ==
As of 31 December 2004, it had a population of 710 and an area of 8.3 square kilometres (3.2 mi^{2}).

Cloz borders the following municipalities: Laurein, Brez, Revò, Dambel and Romallo.

== Demographic evolution ==
Historical population

Year	Pop.	±%
1861	?	—
1871	?	—
1881	?	—
1901	?	—
1911	?	—

Year	Pop.	±%
1921	1,327	—
1931	799	−39.8%
1936	789	−1.3%
1951	881	+11.7%
1961	806	−8.5%

Year	Pop.	±%
1971	743	−7.8%
1981	731	−1.6%
1991	713	−2.5%
2001	684	−4.1%

Source: Data from ISTAT
