= Romallo =

- Comune
- Comune di Romallo
- Location within Italy Location within Trentino-Alto Adige/Südtirol
- Coordinates: 46°24′N 11°4′E
- Country: Italy
- Region: Trentino-Alto Adige/Südtirol
- Province: Trentino (TN)

Area
  - Total: 2.4 km^{2} (0.93 sq mi)
- Elevation: 735 m (2,411 ft)

Population (Dec. 2019)
  - Total: 611
  - Density: 250/km^{2} (660/sq mi)
- Time zone: UTC+1 (CET)
  - Summer (DST): UTC+2 (CEST)
- Postal code: 38020
- Dialing code: 0463
- ISTAT code: 022154

Romallo (Nones: Romàl) is a comune (municipality) in Trentino in the northern Italian region Trentino-Alto Adige/Südtirol, located about 35 kilometres (22 mi) north of Trento. As of 31 December 2004, it had a population of 576 and an area of 2.4 square kilometres (0.93 mi^{2}).

Romallo's parish church is the Chiesa di San Vitale.

Romallo borders the municipalities of Revò, Cloz, Dambel and Sanzeno.

== Demographic evolution ==
Historical population

Year	Pop.	±%
1861	?	—
1871	?	—
1881	?	—
1901	?	—
1911	?	—

Year	Pop.	±%
1921	795	—
1931	678	−14.7%
1936	638	−5.9%
1951	718	+12.5%
1961	661	−7.9%

Year	Pop.	±%
1971	587	−11.2%
1981	594	+1.2%
1991	603	+1.5%
2001	590	−2.2%

Source: Data from ISTAT
