= Amblar-Don =

Coordinates: 46.393°N 11.141°E

- Comune
- Comune di Amblar-Don
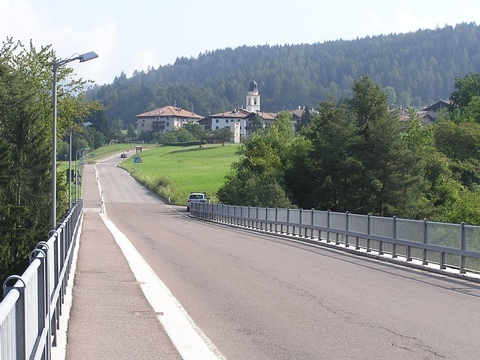

- Location of Amblar-Don in Italy Amblar-Don (Trentino-Alto Adige/Südtirol)
- Country: Italy
- Region: Trentino-Alto Adige/Südtirol
- Province: Trentino (TN)
- Frazioni: Amblar, Don

Government
  - Mayor: Maria Zanotelli

Population (2026)
  - Total: 554
- Time zone: UTC+1 (CET)
  - Summer (DST): UTC+2 (CEST)
- Website: Official website

Amblar-Don is a comune of the Val di Non in the Trentino, northern Italy. It came into existence on 1 January 2016 through the merger of the formerly separate comuni of Amblar and Don.
