= Proveis =

- Comune
- Gemeinde Proveis; Comune di Proves
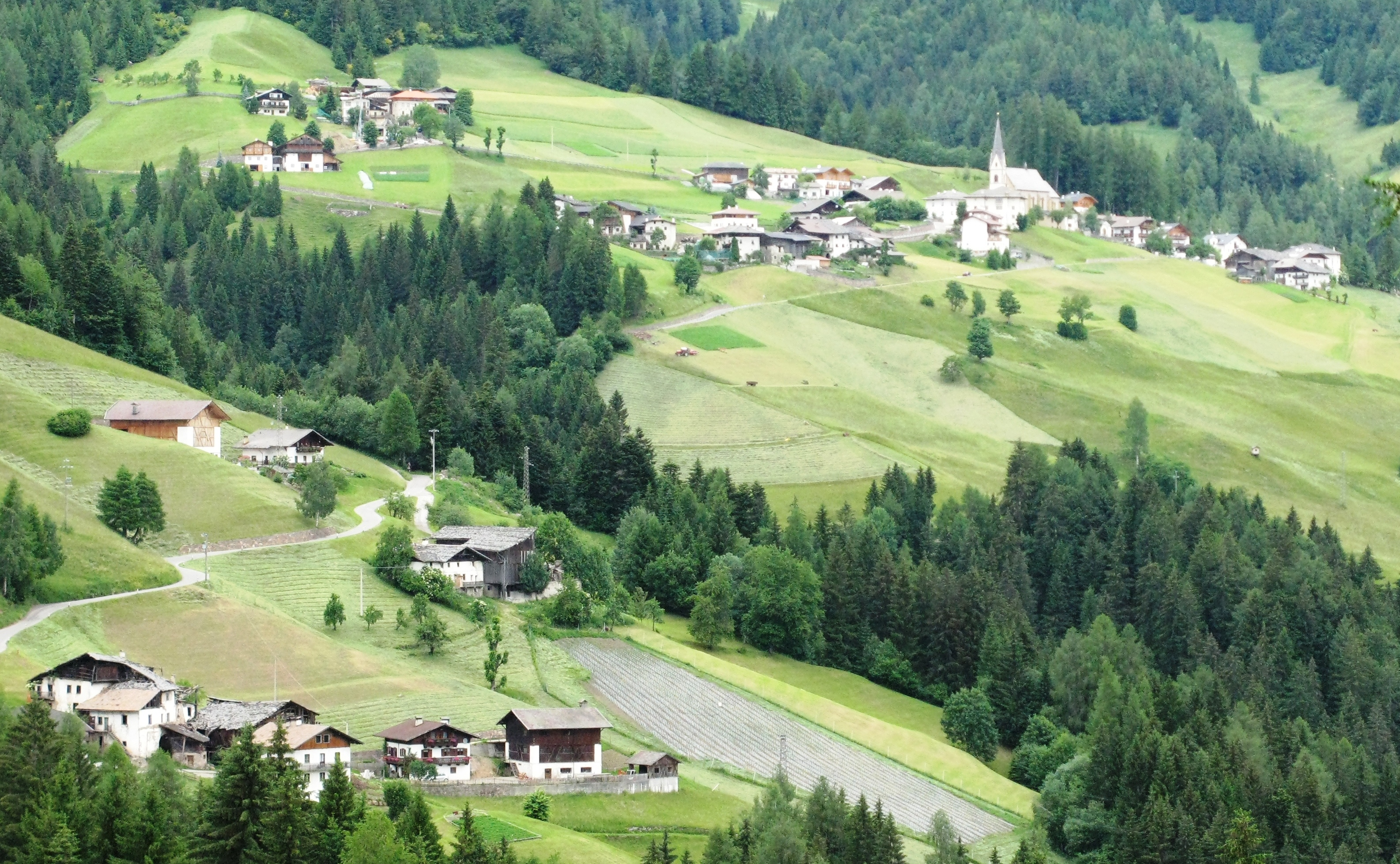
- View of Proveis

- Location within Italy Location within Trentino-Alto Adige/Südtirol
- Coordinates: 46°29′N 11°1′E
- Country: Italy
- Region: Trentino-Alto Adige/Südtirol
- Province: South Tyrol (BZ)

Government
  - Mayor: Ulrich Gamper (SVP)

Area
  - Total: 18.5 km^{2} (7.1 sq mi)

Population (Nov. 2010)
  - Total: 274
  - Density: 14.8/km^{2} (38.4/sq mi)
- Demonym(s): German: Proveiser; Italian: provesini
- Time zone: UTC+1 (CET)
  - Summer (DST): UTC+2 (CEST)
- Postal code: 39040
- Dialing code: 0463
- Website: Official website

Proveis (German: [proˈfaɪs]; Italian: Proves [proˈves]) is a comune (municipality) and a village in South Tyrol in northern Italy, located about 25 kilometres (16 mi) west of Bolzano.

== Geography ==
As of 30 November 2010, Proveis had a population of 274 and an area of 18.5 square kilometres (7.1 mi^{2}).

Proveis borders the following municipalities: Cagnò, Laurein, Rumo and Ulten.

== History ==
=== Coat-of-arms ===
The emblem represents a black grouse or square, with the sides curved and the corners decorated with shamrock on azure. The pheasant symbolizes that the place was once famous for hunting; the four vertices represent the four original German-speaking municipalities of Non Valley: Laurein, Proveis, Unsere Liebe Frau im Walde and St. Felix, the last two united. The emblem was adopted in 1966.

== Society ==
=== Linguistic distribution ===
According to the 2024 census, 97.45% of the population speak German and 2.55% Italian as first language.

=== Demographic evolution ===
Historical population

Year	Pop.	±%
1860	?	—
1870	?	—
1880	535	—
1900	?	—
1910	385	—

Year	Pop.	±%
1921	371	−3.6%
1931	375	+1.1%
1936	392	+4.5%
1951	387	−1.3%
1961	407	+5.2%

Year	Pop.	±%
1971	349	−14.3%
1981	321	−8.0%
1991	298	−7.2%
2001	288	−3.4%

Source: Data from ISTAT
