= Gampen Pass =

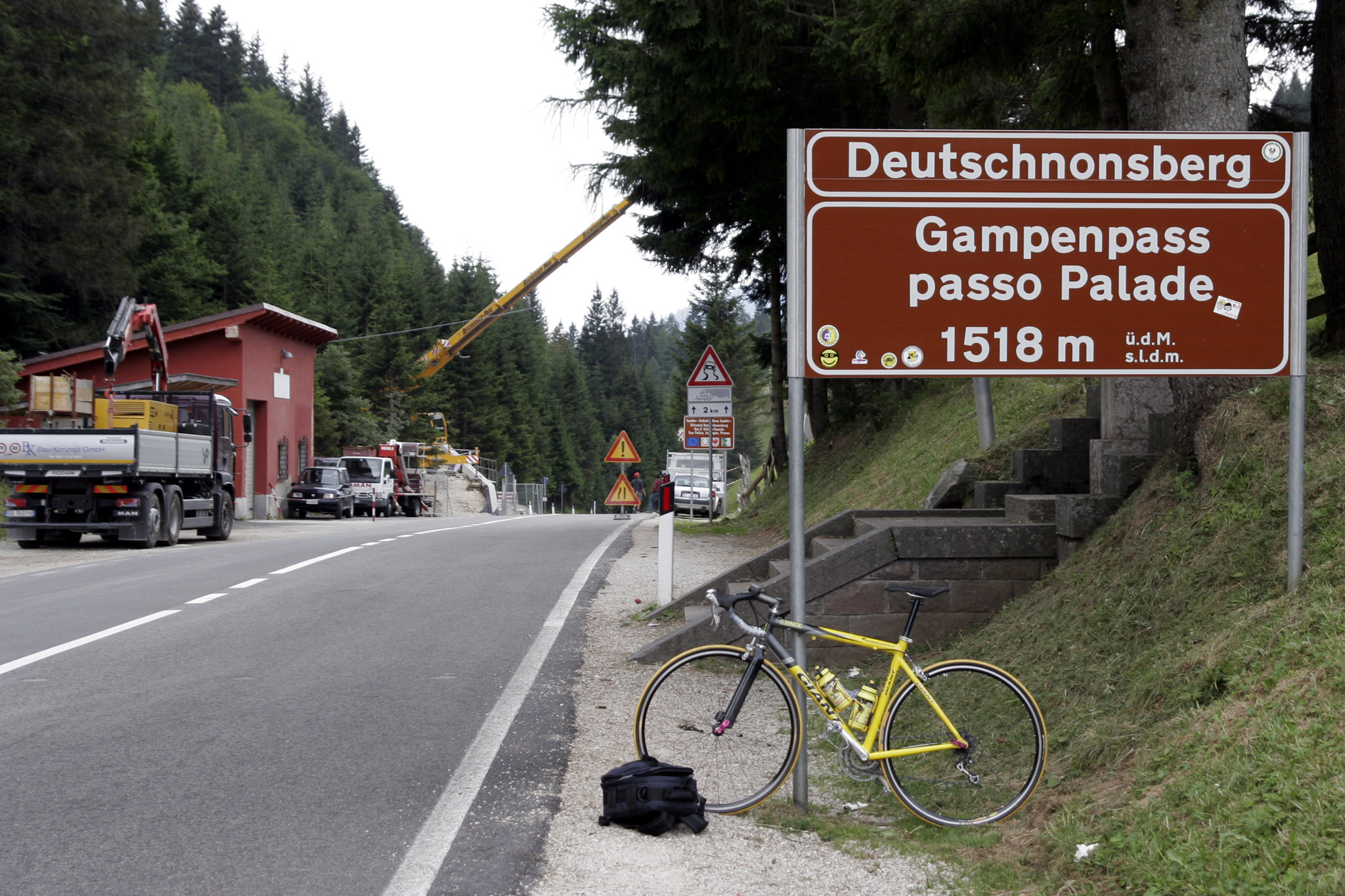
- Gampenpass top

- Location within Alps
- Elevation: 1,518 metres (4,980 ft)
- Traversed by: SS238

Third Approach
- Location: Italy
- Range: Tyrol
- Coordinates: 46°31′49″N 11°06′43″E

Gampen Pass (German: Gampenpass, Gampenjoch, Italian: Passo delle Palade); (1,518 m) is a high mountain pass in the South Tyrol, northern Italy. It connects the Adige valley and the Non Valley. The pass is open year-round. The pass road has a maximum gradient of 9%.

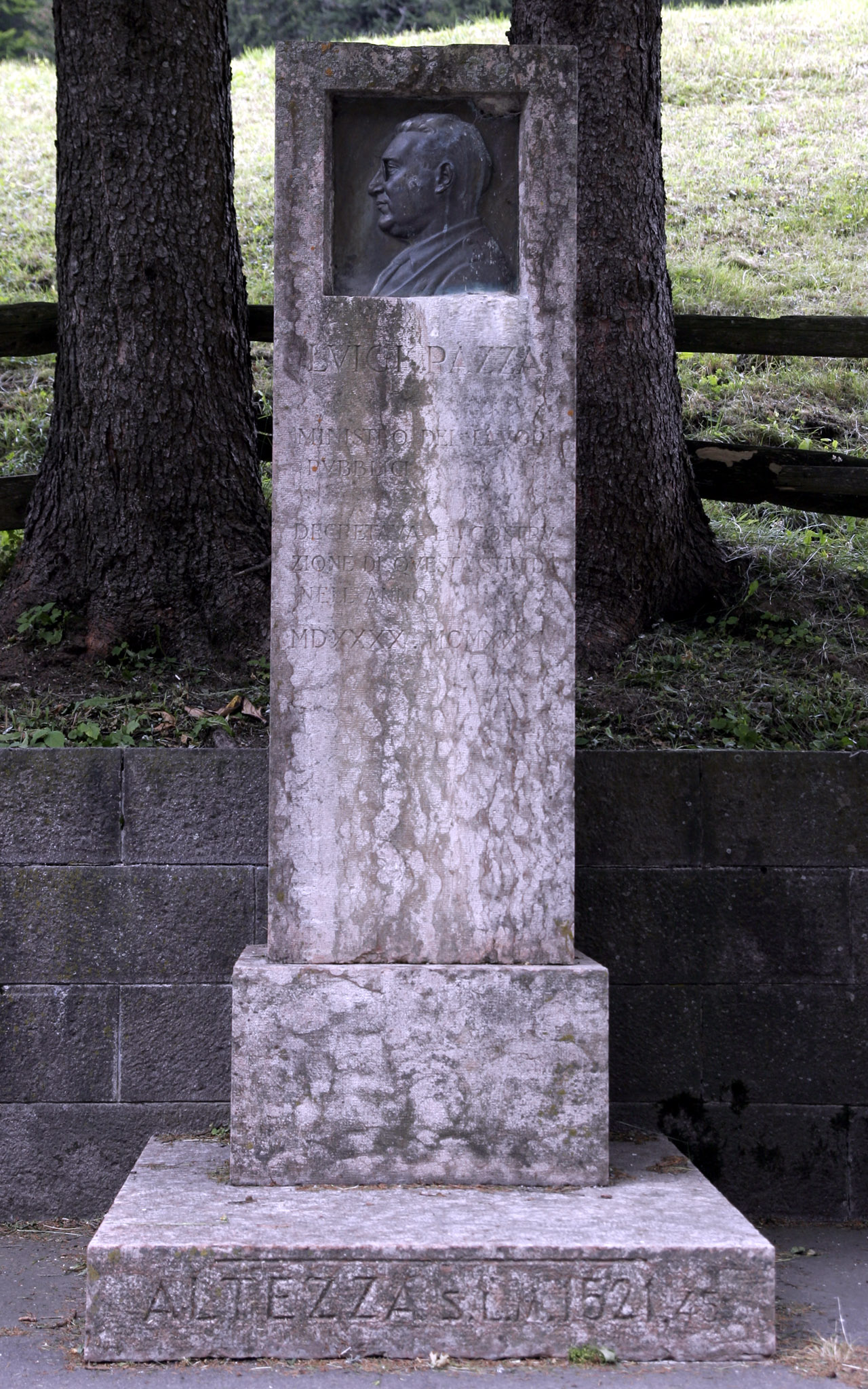
Memorial on top of the pass

From 1810 until 1815, the pass was on the border of the Italian state founded by Napoleon and the Kingdom of Bavaria to the north.

== See also ==
- List of highest paved roads in Europe
- List of mountain passes
