= Cavareno =

Cavareno, Trentino, Italia
- Comune
- Comune di Cavareno
- Location within Italy Location within Trentino-Alto Adige/Südtirol
- Coordinates: 46°25′N 11°8′E
- Country: Italy
- Region: Trentino-Alto Adige/Südtirol
- Province: Trentino (TN)

Government
  - Mayor: Luca Zini

Area
  - Total: 9.7 km^{2} (3.7 sq mi)
- Elevation: 973 m (3,192 ft)

Population (2026)
  - Total: 1,155
  - Density: 120/km^{2} (310/sq mi)
- Demonym: Cavarenesi
- Time zone: UTC+1 (CET)
  - Summer (DST): UTC+2 (CEST)
- Postal code: 38011
- Dialing code: 0463
- Patron saint: Santa Maria Maddalena
- Saint day: 22 July
- Website: Official website

Cavareno (Ciavarén in local dialect) is a comune (municipality) in Trentino in the northern Italian region Trentino-Alto Adige/Südtirol, located about 50 kilometres (31 mi) north of Trento. As of 31 December 2004, it had a population of 940 and an area of 9.7 square kilometres (3.7 mi^{2}).

Cavareno borders the following municipalities: Amblar, Romeno, Ruffré-Mendola, Sarnonico, and Kaltern.

The village is situated on a high plateau at an elevation of 1,000 meters above sea level, surrounded by meadows and woods. Cavareno is a popular holiday destination.

The history of the village began with a Rhaeto-Romanic settlement under the Bishop's rule, followed by Austro-Hungarian rule.

Every August, the village celebrates the "Festa della Regola," also known as the "Charte della Regola," with sporting activities.

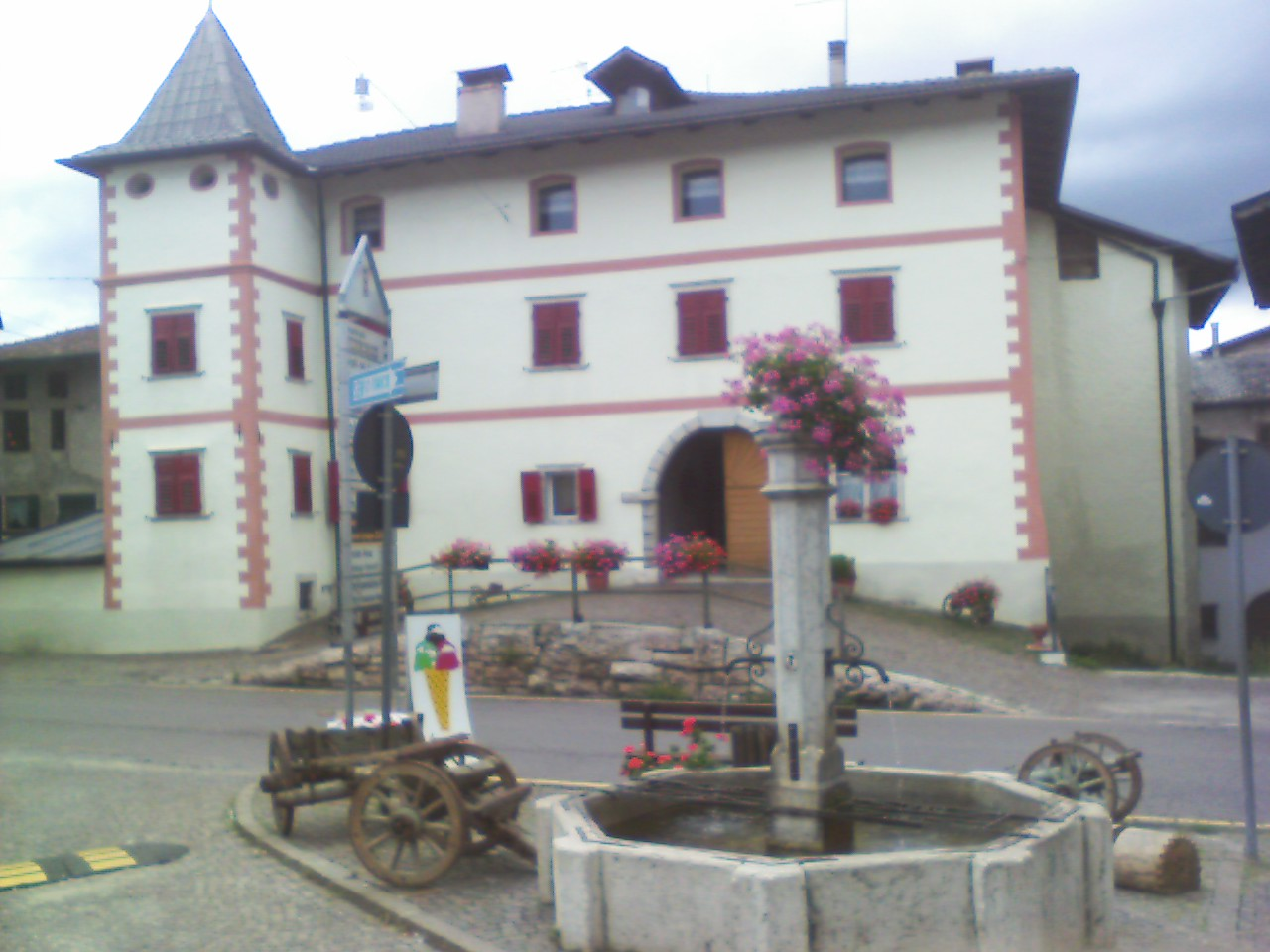
Palazzo Tevini

== Demographic evolution ==
Historical population

Year	Pop.	±%
1861	?	—
1871	?	—
1881	?	—
1901	?	—
1911	?	—

Year	Pop.	±%
1921	1,013	—
1931	860	−15.1%
1936	887	+3.1%
1951	891	+0.5%
1961	891	+0.0%

Year	Pop.	±%
1971	906	+1.7%
1981	842	−7.1%
1991	854	+1.4%
2001	923	+8.1%

Source: Data from ISTAT
