= Don, Trentino =

Don
- Comune
- Comune di Don
- Location within Italy Location within Trentino-Alto Adige/Südtirol
- Coordinates: 46°23′23″N 11°8′12″E
- Country: Italy
- Region: Trentino-Alto Adige/Südtirol
- Province: Trentino (TN)

Area
  - Total: 5.3 km^{2} (2.0 sq mi)

Population (Dec. 2004)
  - Total: 246
  - Density: 46/km^{2} (120/sq mi)
- Time zone: UTC+1 (CET)
  - Summer (DST): UTC+2 (CEST)
- Postal code: 38010
- Dialing code: 0463

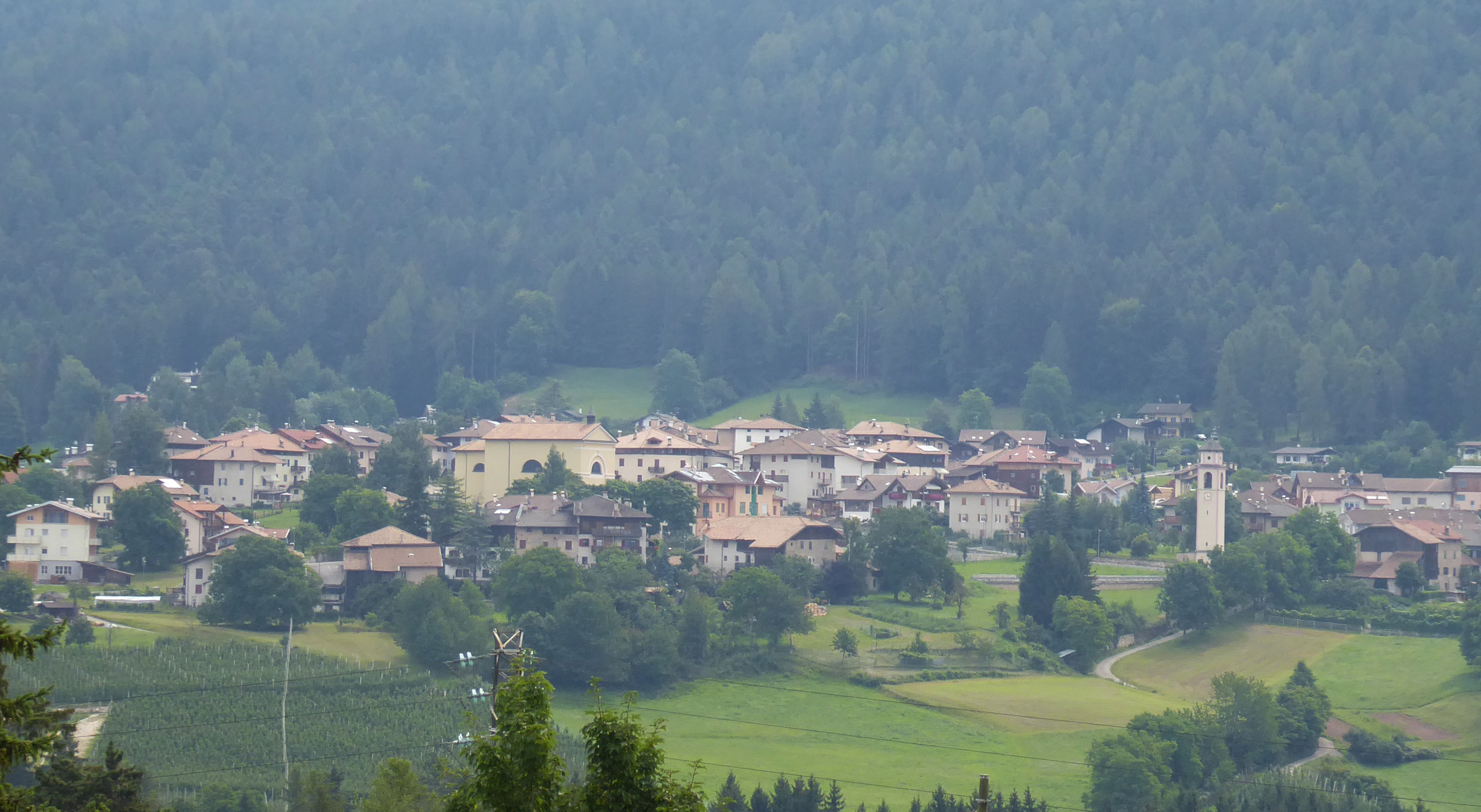
Don as seen from Romeno, Trentino, Italy).

Don (German: Thann or Daun) is a former comune in Trentino in north Italy. On 1 January 2016 it was merged with the neighboring comune of Amblar to form the new comune of Amblar-Don, of which it is now a frazione.

== Geography ==
As of 31 December 2004, it had a population of 246 and an area of 5.3 square kilometres (2.0 mi^{2}).

== Demographic evolution ==
Historical population

Year	Pop.	±%
1861	?	—
1871	?	—
1881	?	—
1901	?	—
1911	?	—

Year	Pop.	±%
1921	363	—
1931	323	−11.0%
1936	304	−5.9%
1951	279	−8.2%
1961	256	−8.2%

Year	Pop.	±%
1971	222	−13.3%
1981	205	−7.7%
1991	227	+10.7%
2001	224	−1.3%

Source: Data from ISTAT
