= Lago di Santa Giustina =

Lake in Trentino, Italy

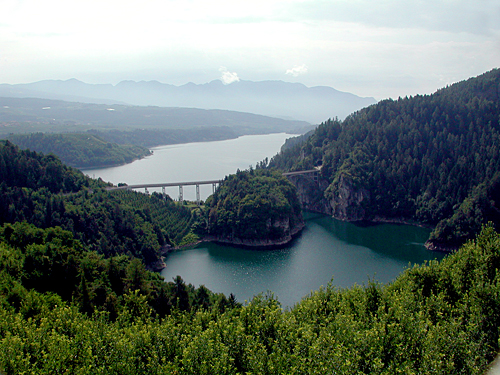

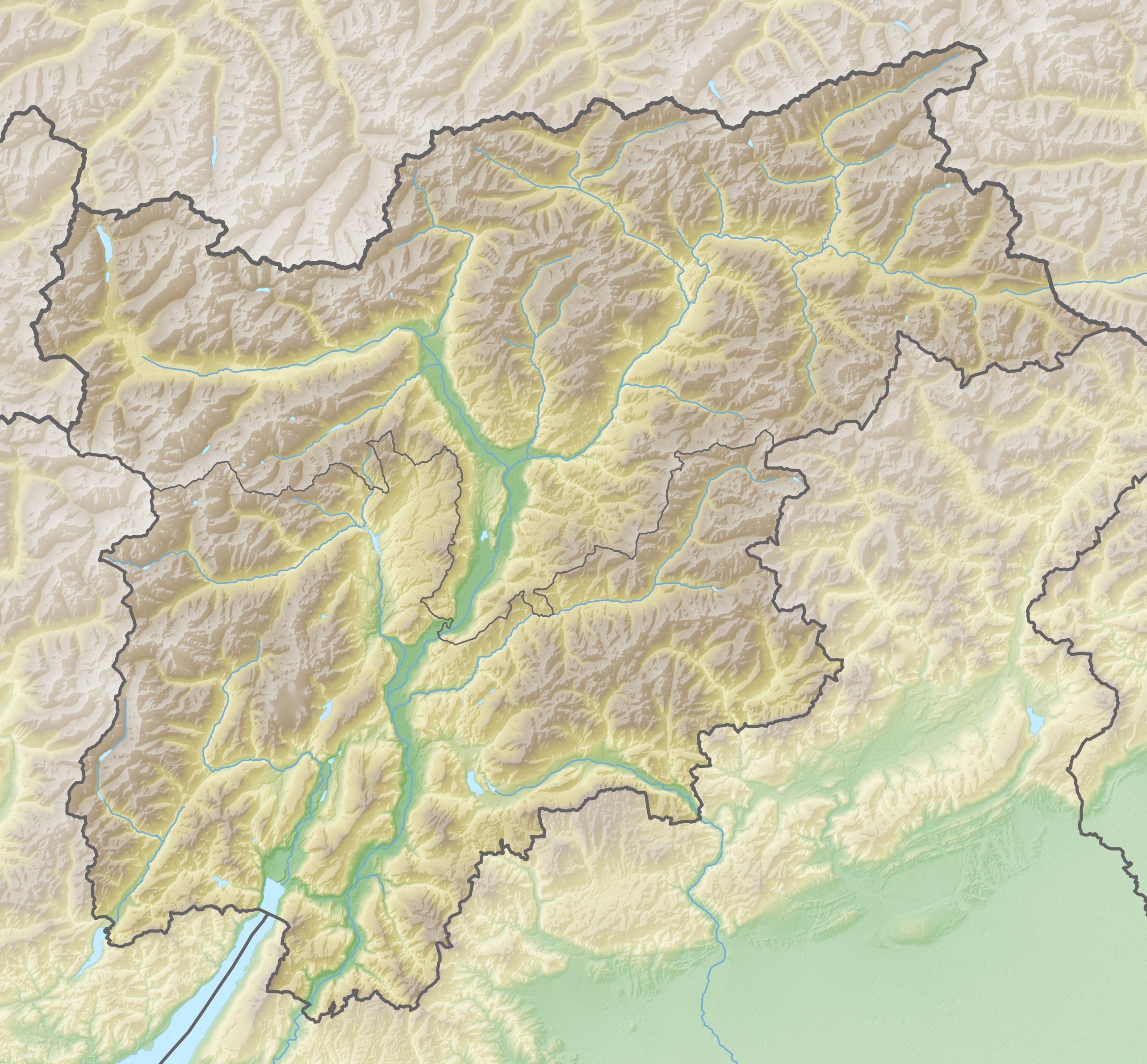
- Location within Trentino-Alto Adige/Südtirol
- Location: Trentino
- Coordinates: 46°22′23″N 11°02′57″E
- Primary inflows: Torrente Noce, Torrente Novella
- Primary outflows: Noce
- Basin countries: Italy

Lago di Santa Giustina is an artificial lake in Trentino, Italy. It is the largest lake in the province.

Historical images from Archivio storico del Touring Club Italiano

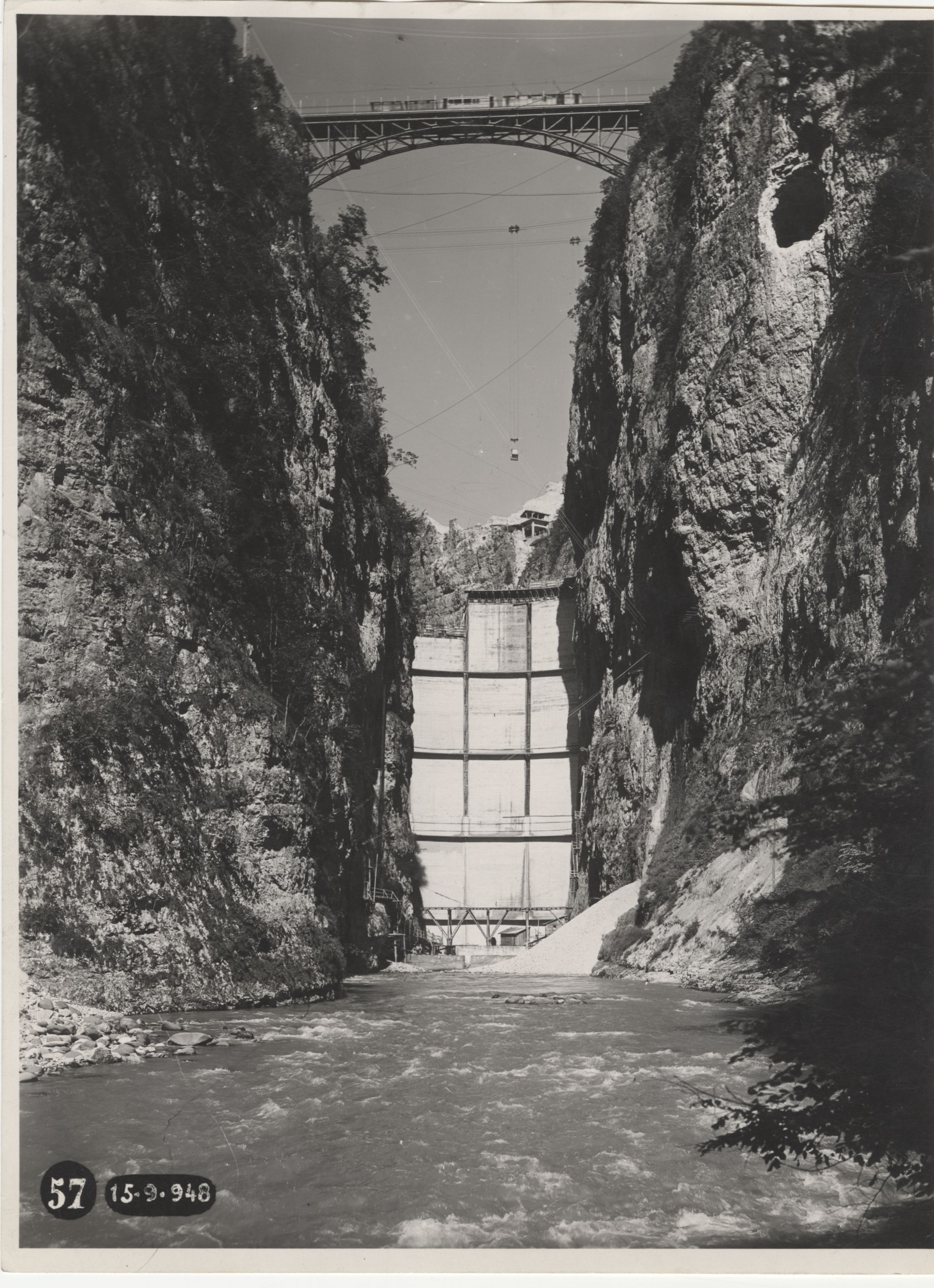
The dam under construction in 1948

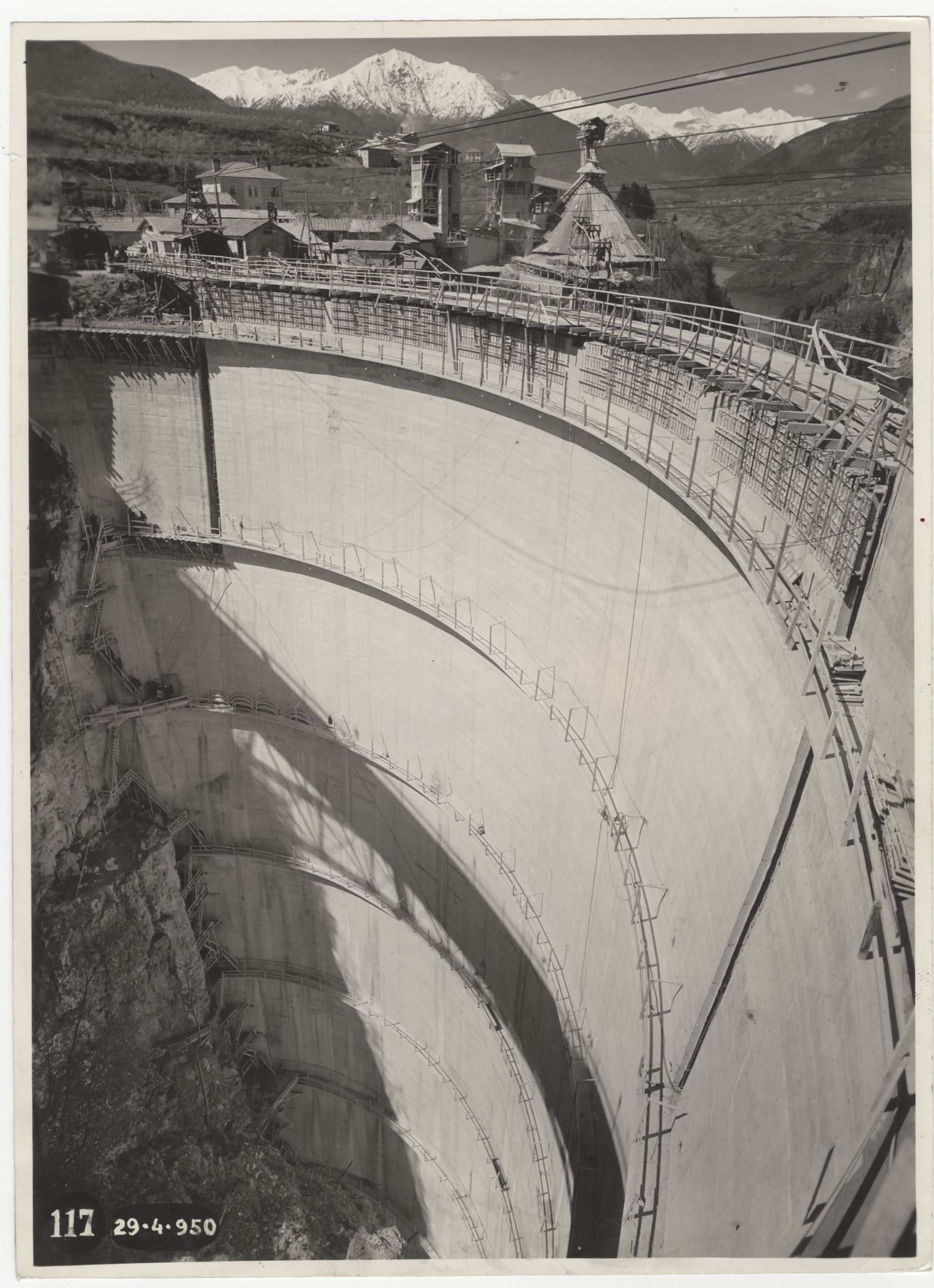
Detail of the dam under construction (1950)

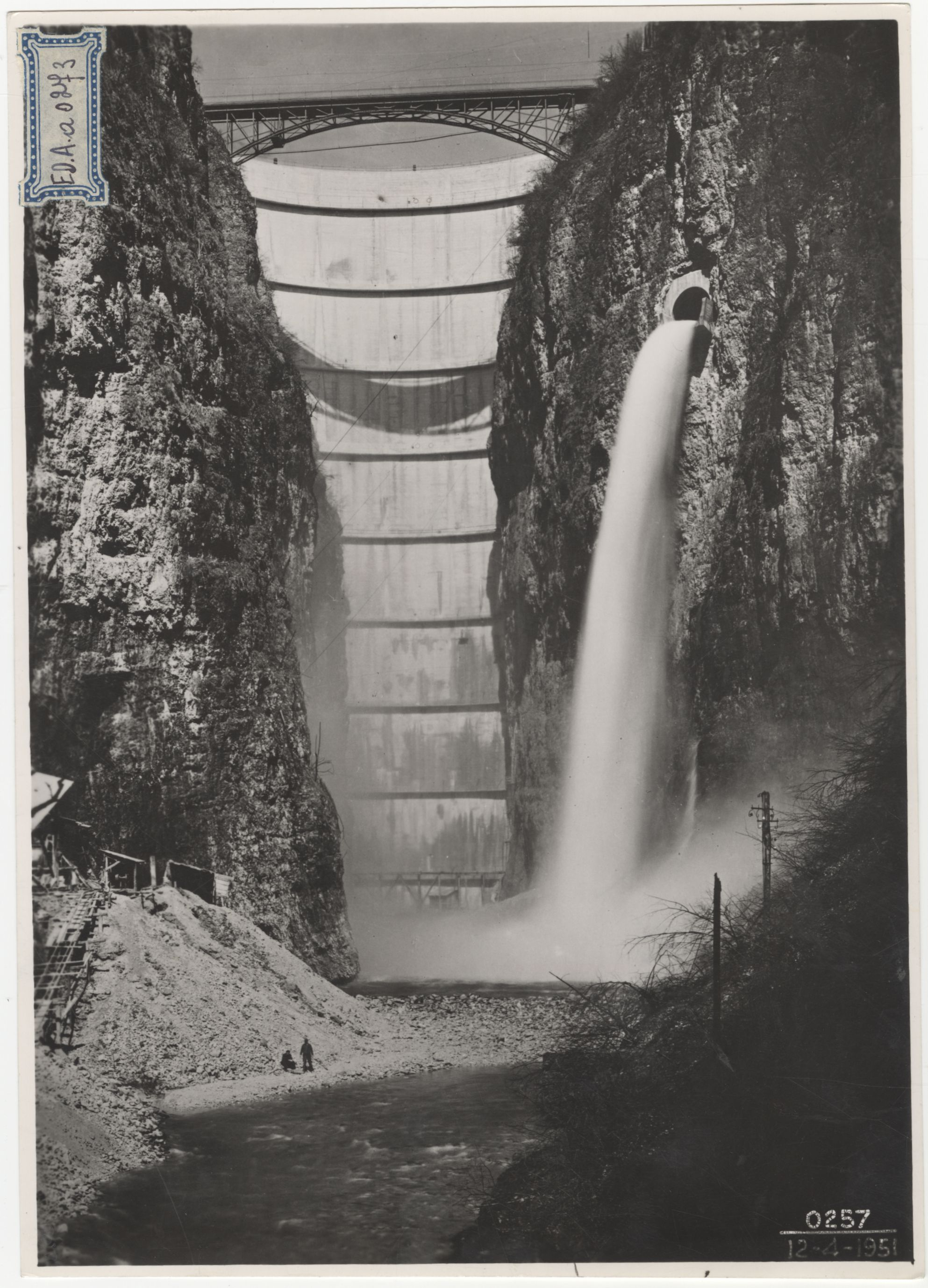
During water discharge (1951)

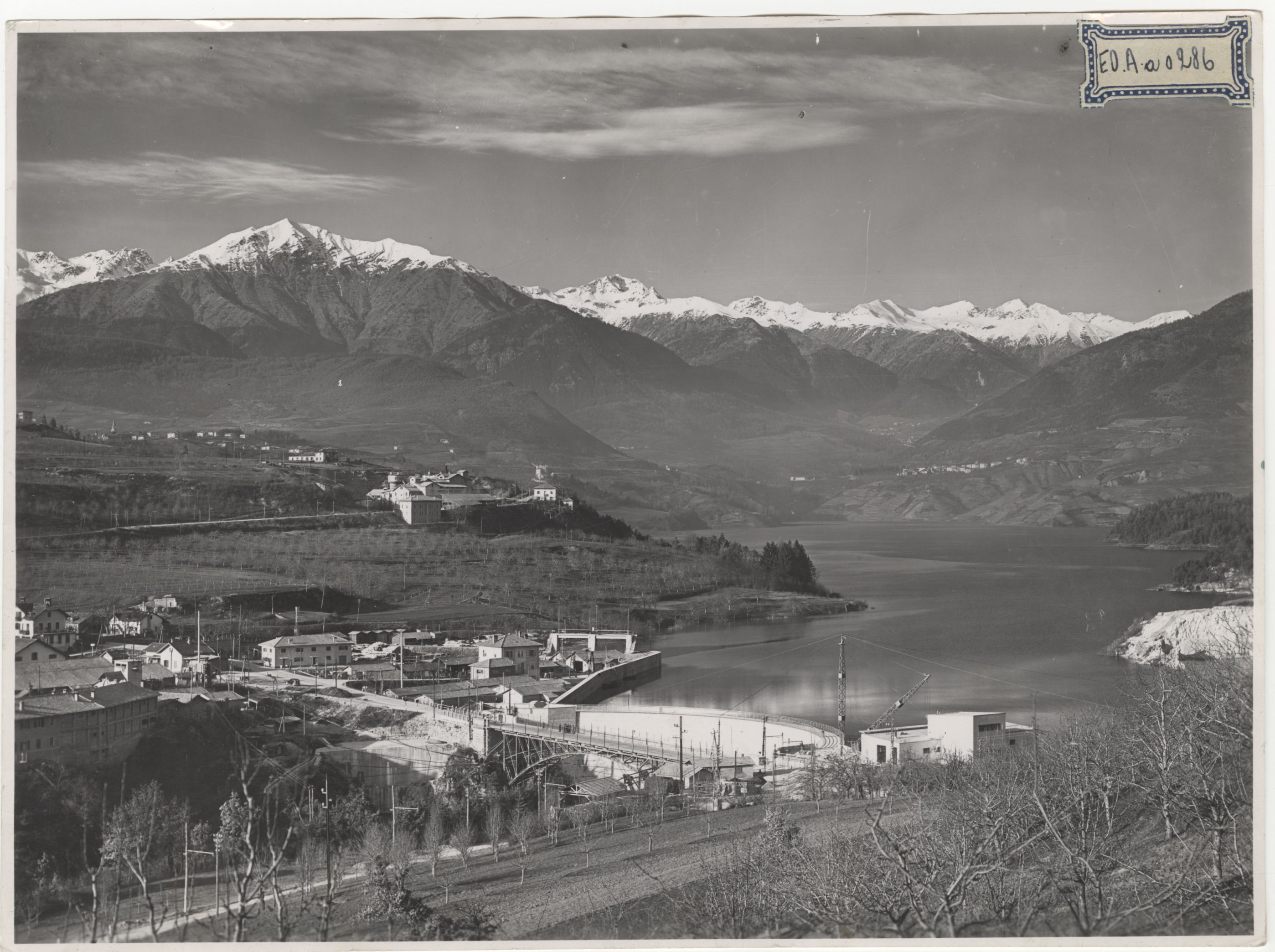
The lake and dam in 1958
