= Ruffré-Mendola =

- Comune
- Comune di Ruffré-Mendola
- Location within Italy Location within Trentino-Alto Adige/Südtirol
- Coordinates: 46°25′N 11°11′E
- Country: Italy
- Region: Trentino-Alto Adige/Südtirol
- Province: Trentino (TN)

Government
  - Mayor: Donato Seppi

Area
  - Total: 6 km^{2} (2.3 sq mi)
- Elevation: 1,175 m (3,855 ft)

Population (31 October 2007)ISTAT
  - Total: 432
  - Density: 72/km^{2} (190/sq mi)
- Demonym: Ruffredani
- Time zone: UTC+1 (CET)
  - Summer (DST): UTC+2 (CEST)
- Postal code: 38010
- Dialing code: 0463
- Website: Official website

Ruffré-Mendola (Rufré-Méndola in local dialect) is a comune (municipality) in Trentino in the northern Italian region Trentino-Alto Adige/Südtirol, located about 40 kilometres (25 mi) north of Trento. As of 31 December 2004, it had a population of 444 and an area of 6.6 square kilometres (2.5 mi^{2}).

It borders the following municipalities: Sarnonico, Caldaro and Cavareno.

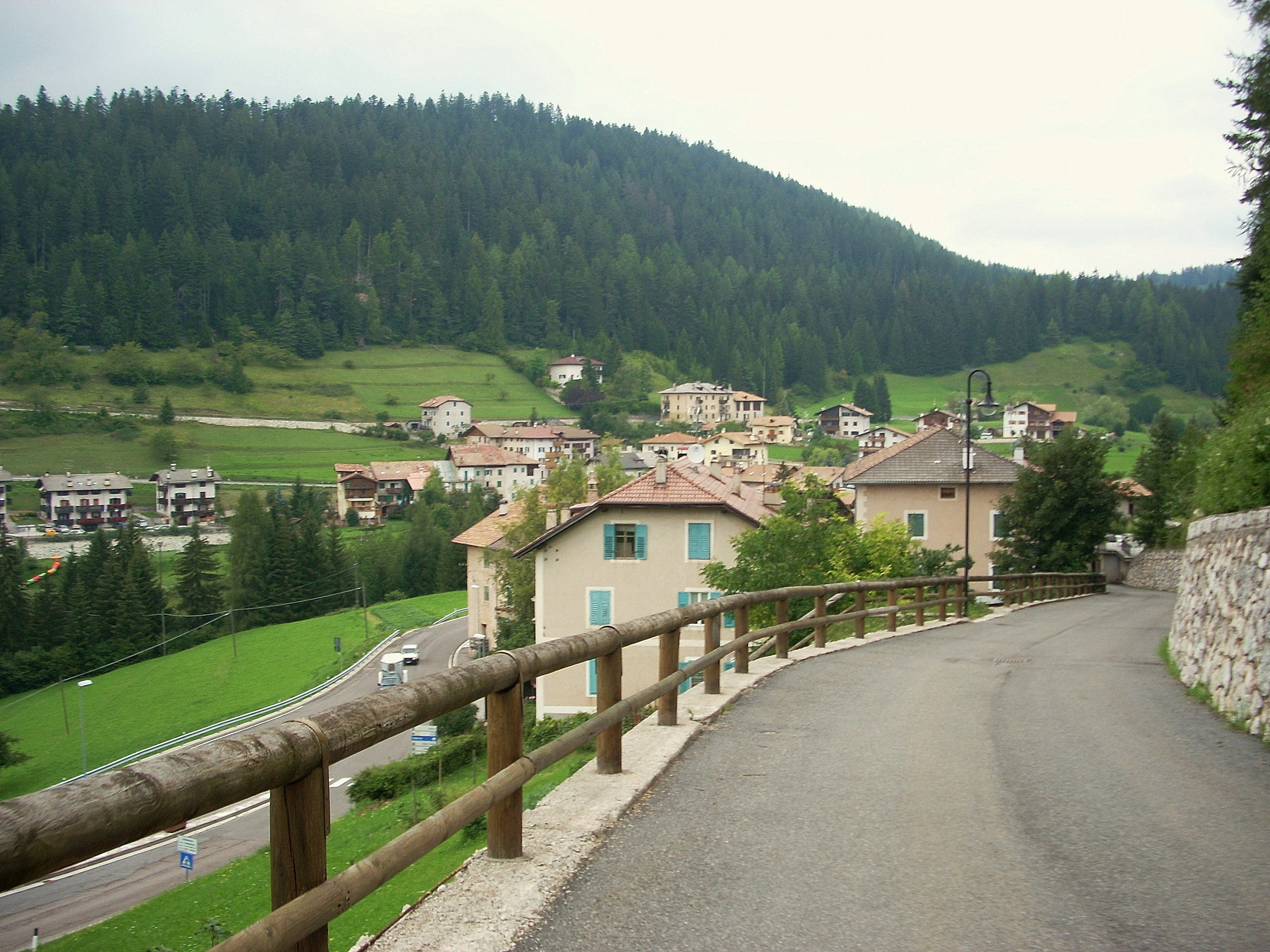
the town of Ruffré-Mendola

== Demographic evolution ==
Historical population

| Year | Pop. | ±% |
|---|---|---|
| 1861 | ? | — |
| 1871 | ? | — |
| 1881 | ? | — |
| 1901 | ? | — |
| 1911 | ? | — |

| Year | Pop. | ±% |
|---|---|---|
| 1921 | 889 | — |
| 1931 | 776 | −12.7% |
| 1936 | 703 | −9.4% |
| 1951 | 647 | −8.0% |
| 1961 | 554 | −14.4% |

| Year | Pop. | ±% |
|---|---|---|
| 1971 | 460 | −17.0% |
| 1981 | 438 | −4.8% |
| 1991 | 409 | −6.6% |
| 2001 | 412 | +0.7% |
| 2011 | 416 | +1.0% |

Source: Data from ISTAT
