= Laurein =

- Comune
- Gemeinde Laurein; Comune di Lauregno
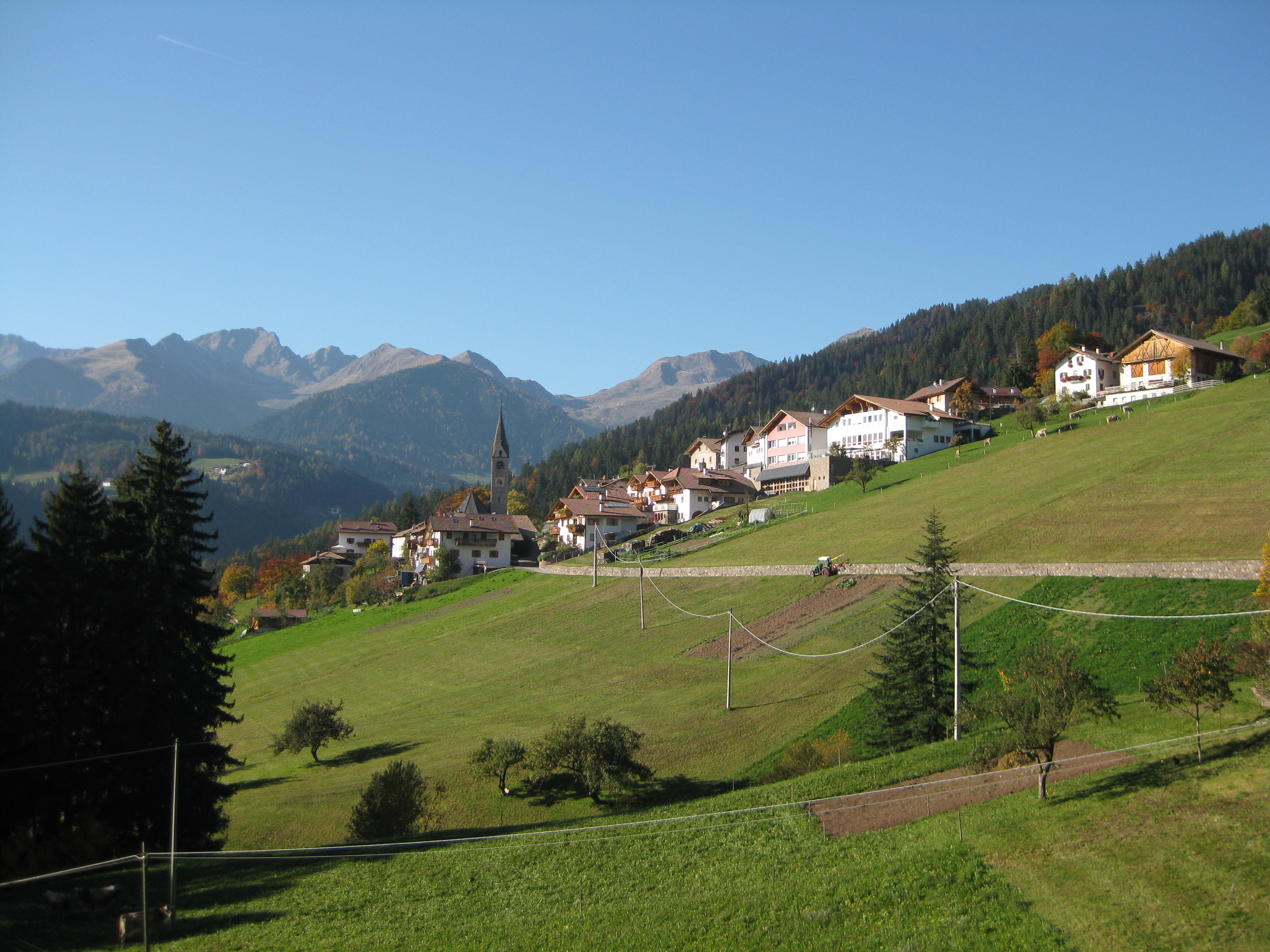
- View of Laurein

- Location within Italy Location within Trentino-Alto Adige/Südtirol
- Coordinates: 46°27′N 11°4′E
- Country: Italy
- Region: Trentino-Alto Adige/Südtirol
- Province: South Tyrol (BZ)

Government
  - Mayor: Hartmann Thaler (SVP)

Area
  - Total: 14 km^{2} (5.4 sq mi)

Population (Nov. 2010)
  - Total: 346
  - Density: 25/km^{2} (64/sq mi)
- Demonym(s): German:Laureiner; Italian: lauregnesi
- Time zone: UTC+1 (CET)
  - Summer (DST): UTC+2 (CEST)
- Postal code: 39040
- Dialing code: 0436
- Website: Official website

Laurein (German: [laʊˈraɪn]; Italian: Lauregno [lauˈreɲɲo]) is a comune (municipality) and a village in South Tyrol in northern Italy, located about 20 kilometres (12 mi) west of Bolzano.

== Geography ==
As of 30 November 2010, it had a population of 346 and an area of 14.2 square kilometres (5.5 mi^{2}).

Laurein borders the following municipalities: Brez, Cagnò, Castelfondo, Cloz, Proveis, Revò, St. Pankraz and Ulten.

== History ==
=== Coat-of-arms ===
The emblem represents a sable plough on or square, with the sides curved and the corners decorated with shamrock on azure. The plough symbolizes the reclamation of the fields and their processing; the four vertices represent the four original German-speaking municipalities of Non Valley: Laurein, Proveis, Unsere Liebe Frau im Walde and St. Felix. The emblem was adopted in 1967.

== Society ==
=== Linguistic distribution ===
According to the 2024 census, 97.77% of the population speak German and 2.23% Italian as first language.

=== Demographic evolution ===
Historical population

| Year | Pop. | ±% |
|---|---|---|
| 1860 | ? | — |
| 1870 | ? | — |
| 1880 | 501 | — |
| 1900 | ? | — |
| 1910 | 489 | — |

| Year | Pop. | ±% |
|---|---|---|
| 1921 | 512 | +4.7% |
| 1931 | 517 | +1.0% |
| 1936 | 489 | −5.4% |
| 1951 | 440 | −10.0% |
| 1961 | 465 | +5.7% |

| Year | Pop. | ±% |
|---|---|---|
| 1971 | 426 | −8.4% |
| 1981 | 384 | −9.9% |
| 1991 | 346 | −9.9% |
| 2001 | 361 | +4.3% |

Source: Data from ISTAT
