= Cles =

- Comune
- Comune di Cles
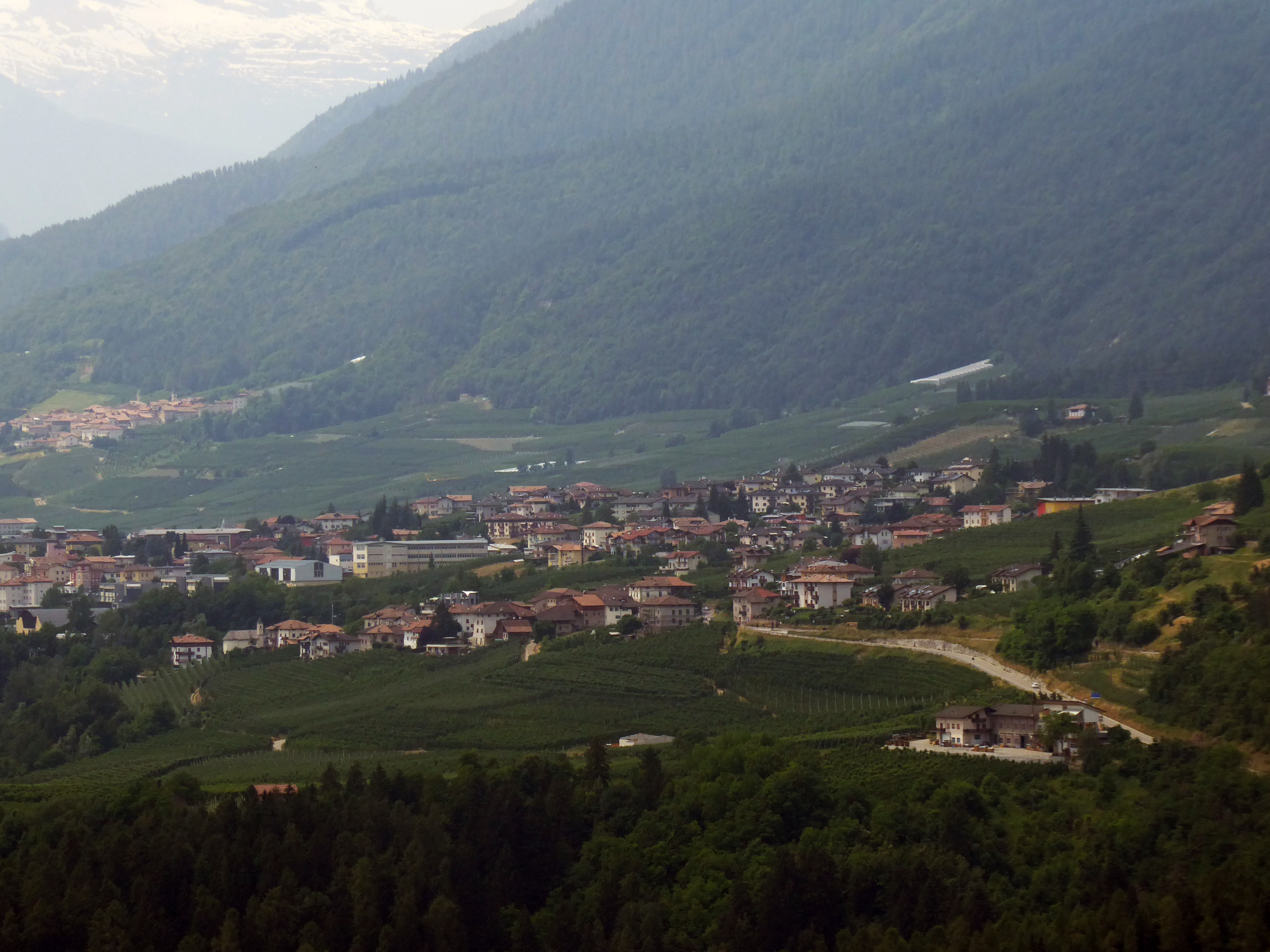
- Cles

- Location within Italy Location within Trentino-Alto Adige/Südtirol
- Coordinates: 46°22′N 11°02′E
- Country: Italy
- Region: Trentino-Alto Adige/Südtirol
- Province: Trentino (TN)
- Frazioni: Caltron, Dres, Pez, Maiano, Mechel, Spinazzeda

Government
  - Mayor: Stella Menapace (PATT)

Area
  - Total: 39.17 km^{2} (15.12 sq mi)
- Elevation: 658 m (2,159 ft)

Population (2026)
  - Total: 7,480
  - Density: 191/km^{2} (495/sq mi)
- Demonym: Clesiani
- Time zone: UTC+1 (CET)
  - Summer (DST): UTC+2 (CEST)
- Postal code: 38023
- Dialing code: 0463
- Patron saint: Santa Maria Assunta
- Saint day: August 15
- Website: Official website

Cles (German: Glöß; Nones: Clés or Cliès) is a town and comune in Trentino, in the Trentino-Alto Adige/Südtirol region of northern Italy. It is the main town of Val di Non.

It is the main town of and is located in Val di Non. Monte di Cles and Monte Peller (2,319 m (7,608.27 ft) above sea level) are located to the west of the residential area, while Lake Santa Giustina is on the east.

== History ==
Prior to World War I, Cles was part of the Austrian Empire. After the war, the region was ceded to Italy with the dissolution of the Austro–Hungarian Monarchy.

== Lake Santa Giustina ==
Lake Santa Giustina is an artificial lake which was created by the dike on the creek Noce. The dam was completed in 1950, is 152 metres high and it was the highest dam in Europe at the time. The lake can contain up to about 180 million cubic metres water, which feeds the turbines of the hydroelectric plant in Taio. The lake is named after the location where the dam is placed, which in turn is named after an ancient hermitage of which only ruins are left, covered by a natural hollow of the rock.

== Tabula clesiana ==
The Tabula clesiana is a bronze plate measuring 49.9 by 37.8 by 0.61 centimetres (19.65 by 14.88 by 0.24 in) that was discovered in 1869 at Campi Neri in Cles. It contains the edict of the Emperor Claudius of 46 AD, which granted Roman citizenship to the Alpine peoples of the Anauni, Sinduni and Tulliasses. It is kept at the Castello del Buonconsiglio Museum in Trento.

The Tabula is an important evidence of the rapid assimilation by the Roman world of the Alpine peoples of farmers-hunters; but also from the point of view of the Roman law the first evidence of the introduction of delatores in the fiscal controversy.

== Notable people ==
- Pietro Antonio Lorenzoni, (1721–1782) painter
- Bernardo Clesio, (1484–1539) cardinal and diplomat
- Luca de Aliprandini, alpine skier (b. 1990)
- Jari Kessler, figure skater (b. 1996)
- Letizia Borghesi, cyclist (b. 1998)
- Vladimir Barbu, competitive diver (b. 1998)
- Letizia Paternoster, road and track cyclist (b. 1999)
- Andrea Pinamonti, footballer (b. 1999)
- Nadia Battocletti, runner (b. 2000)

== Gallery ==
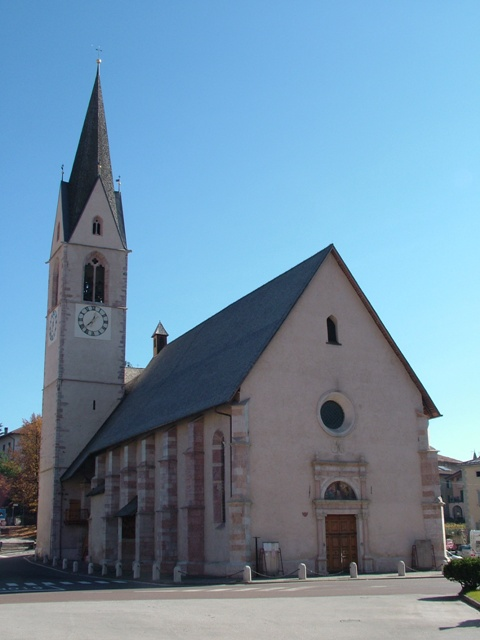
Santa Maria Assunta Parish church

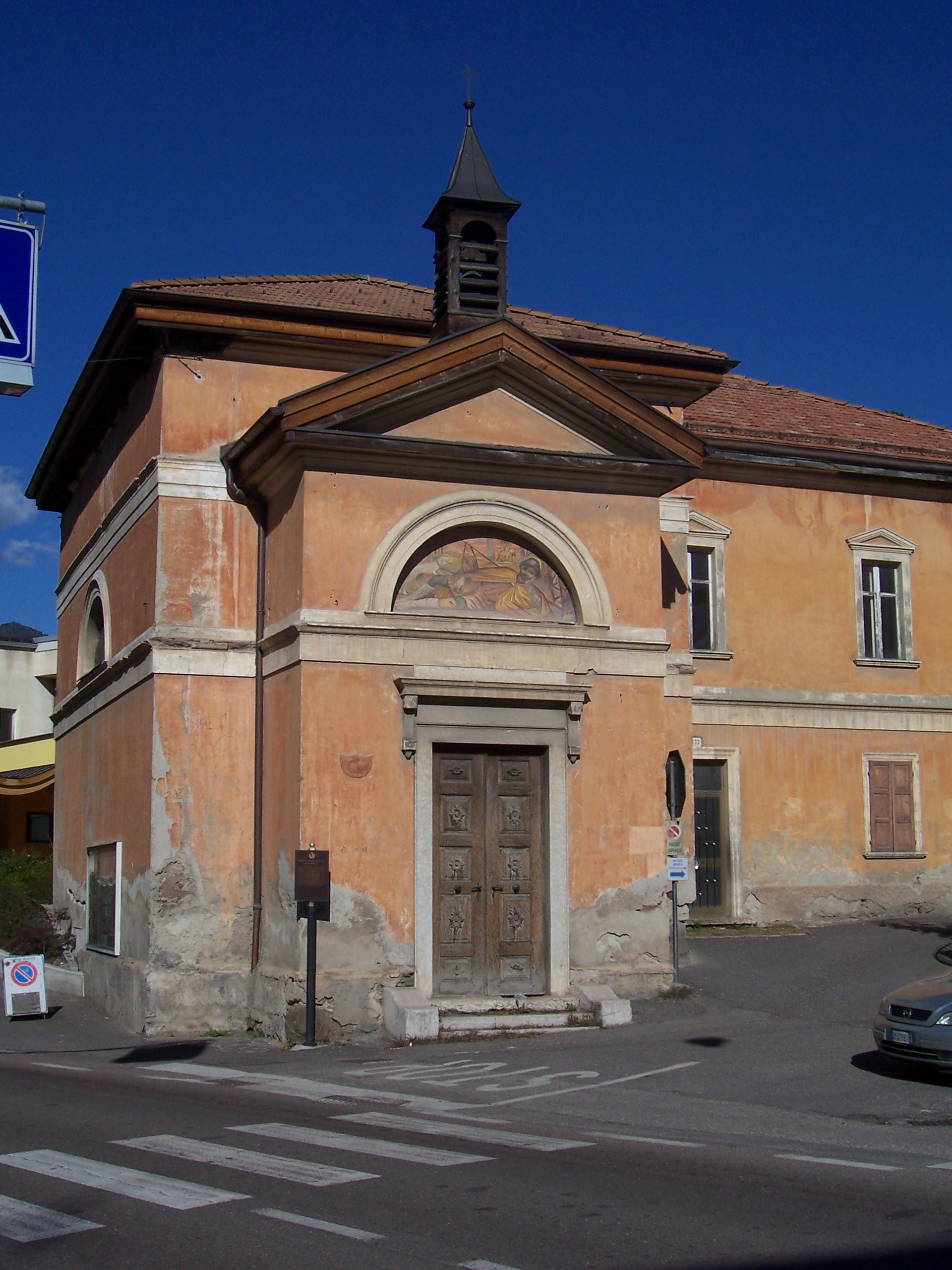
Saint Roch Church

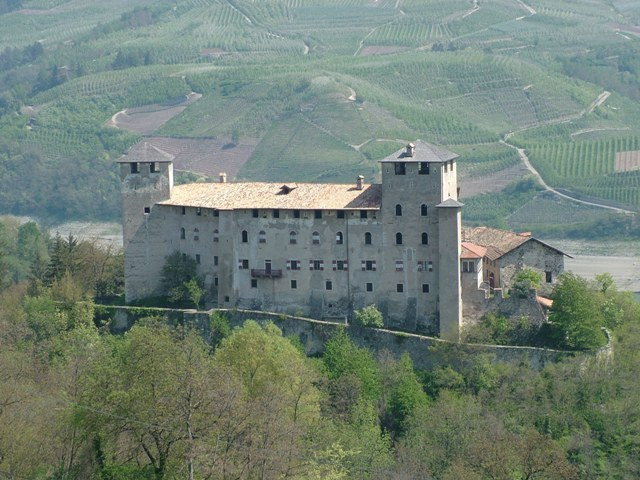
Cles Castle
