= Sarnonico =

- Comune
- Comune di Sarnonico
- Location within Italy Location within Trentino-Alto Adige/Südtirol
- Coordinates: 46°25′N 11°9′E
- Country: Italy
- Region: Trentino-Alto Adige/Südtirol
- Province: Trentino (TN)
- Frazioni: Seio

Government
  - Mayor: Emanuela Abram

Area
  - Total: 12.1 km^{2} (4.7 sq mi)
- Elevation: 980 m (3,220 ft)

Population (Dec. 2004)
  - Total: 696
  - Density: 57.5/km^{2} (149/sq mi)
- Demonym: Sorsi
- Time zone: UTC+1 (CET)
  - Summer (DST): UTC+2 (CEST)
- Postal code: 38010
- Dialing code: 0463
- Website: Official website

Sarnonico (Sarnónec in local dialect) is a comune (municipality) in Trentino in the northern Italian region Trentino-Alto Adige/Südtirol, located about 40 kilometres (25 mi) north of Trento. As of 31 December 2004, it had a population of 696 and an area of 12.1 square kilometres (4.7 mi^{2}).

The municipality of Sarnonico contains the frazione (subdivision) Seio.

Sarnonico borders the following municipalities: Brez, Cavareno, Dambel, Fondo, Malosco, Romeno, Ronzone, Ruffré-Mendola, Eppan and Kaltern.

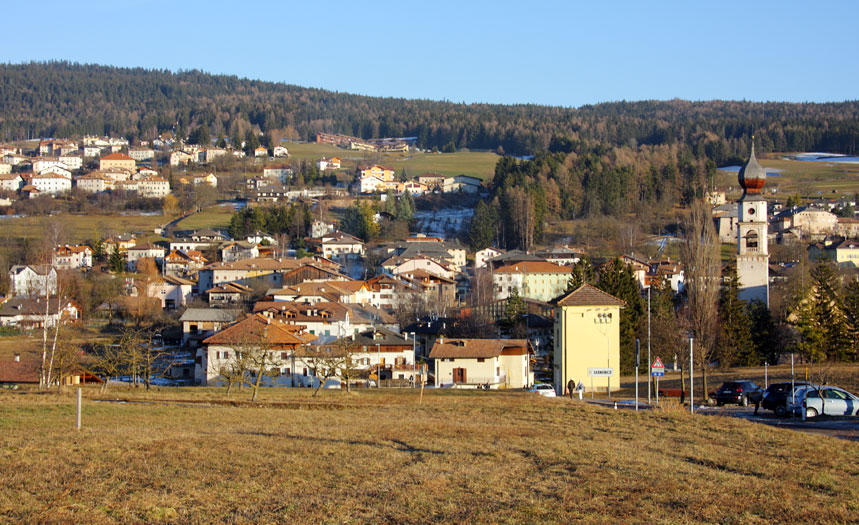
the town of Sarnonico

== Demographic evolution ==
Historical population

Year	Pop.	±%
1861	?	—
1871	?	—
1881	?	—
1901	?	—
1911	?	—

Year	Pop.	±%
1921	857	—
1931	783	−8.6%
1936	771	−1.5%
1951	677	−12.2%
1961	683	+0.9%

Year	Pop.	±%
1971	622	−8.9%
1981	591	−5.0%
1991	584	−1.2%
2001	662	+13.4%

Source: Data from ISTAT
