= Amblar =

- Comune
- Comune di Amblar
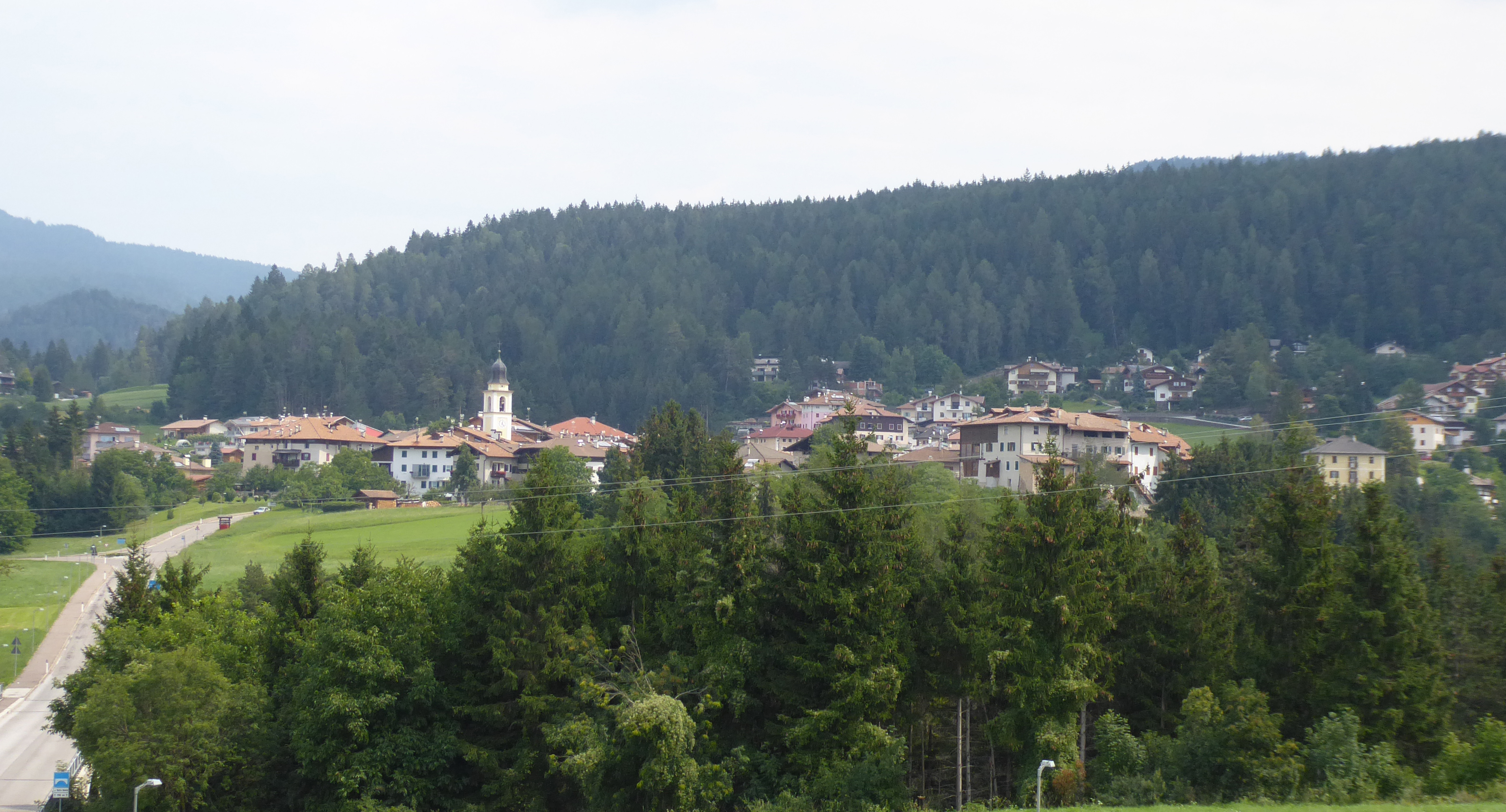

- Location within Italy Location within Trentino-Alto Adige/Südtirol
- Coordinates: 46°23′43″N 11°8′47″E
- Country: Italy
- Region: Trentino-Alto Adige/Südtirol
- Province: Trentino (TN)

Area
  - Total: 14 km^{2} (5.4 sq mi)
- Elevation: 980 m (3,220 ft)

Population
  - Total: 213
  - Density: 15/km^{2} (39/sq mi)
- Demonym: Amblarotti
- Time zone: UTC+1 (CET)
  - Summer (DST): UTC+2 (CEST)
- Postal code: 38010
- Dialing code: 0463
- Patron saint: Saint Vigilius
- Saint day: 26 June

Amblar (German: Ambler) is a former comune in Trentino in north Italy. On 1 January 2016 it was merged with the neighboring comune of Don to form the new comune of Amblar-Don, of which it is now a frazione.
