= Nones dialect =

Ladin dialect of Trentino, Italy

Nones
- nònes
- Native to: Italy
- Region: Non Valley, Trentino, northern Italy
- Native speakers: (undated figure of 30,000)
- Language family: Indo-European: Italic; Latino-Faliscan; Romance; Italo-Western; Western Romance; Gallo-Romance; Rhaeto-Romance or Gallo-Rhaetian; Ladin; Nones

Language codes
- ISO 639-3: –
- Glottolog: none1236

Nones (autonym: nònes, Italian: Noneso, German: Nonsberger Mundart) is a dialect named after and spoken in the Non Valley in Trentino, northern Italy. It is estimated that around 30,000 people speak in Non Valley, Rabbi Valley and the low Sole Valley.

Ethnologue and Glottolog classify it as a dialect of the Ladin language, It is alternatively considered as a dialect belonging to the range of Gallo-Italic languages of Northern Italy.
