= St. Felix, South Tyrol =

Village in South Tyrol, Italy

Coordinates: 46°29′32″N 11°07′50″E

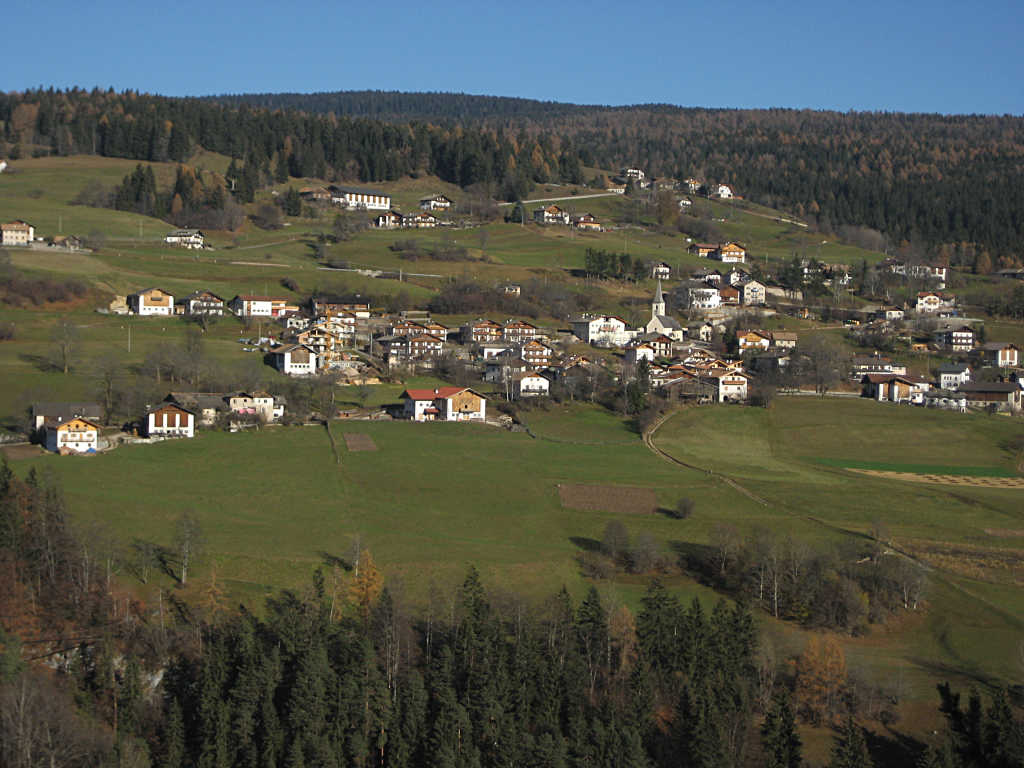
St. Felix / S. Felice, November 2006, SSW view

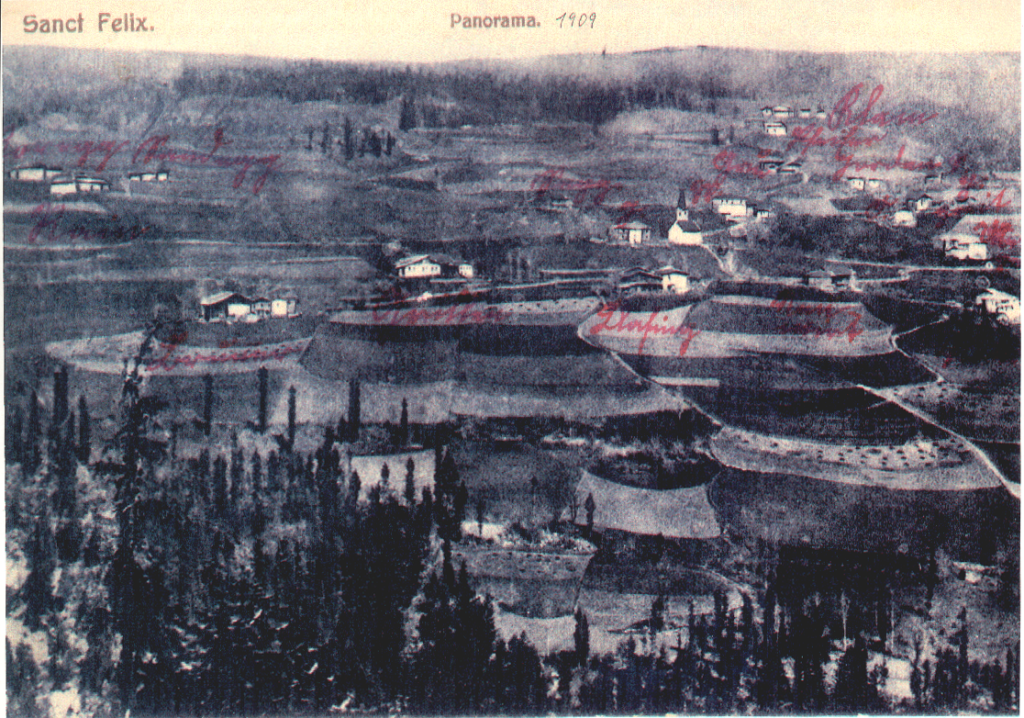
St. Felix / S. Felice, 1909, SSW view

St. Felix (Italian San Felice) is a village in South Tyrol, Italy, and is together with Unsere Liebe Frau im Walde one of the two fractions of the municipality Unsere liebe Frau im Walde-St. Felix.

The village is situated 1265 meters above sea level in the Non Valley and covers an area of 1480 hectares. St. Felix is located directly on the border to the Italian-speaking province of Trentino. Its inhabitants are native German speakers and for this reason, the area is called Deutschnonsberg (literally German Non Mountain). The main attractions of this remote village include the lake Felixer Weiher (1605 meters above sea level).

== Short historical overview ==
Until the 19th century, St. Felix was called Caseid (from Italian casetta, meaning small house, little settlement). It was first mentioned in 1233 in connection with Vitus de Vasio (of castle Vasio, between Fondo and Brez). Today's name derives from the small church in the town that was built in honor of Saint Felix of Nola. For the short period from 1810 to 1814 it was part of the newly founded Napoleonic Kingdom of Italy. St. Felix became an independent municipality when it split from Unsere Liebe Frau im Walde in 1864.

Until the First World War the village was part of the County of Tyrol, a crown land of Austria-Hungary. In 1919, the Treaty of Saint-Germain-en-Laye sanctioned the annexation of the southern parts of Tyrol, including St. Felix, by Italy. In 1928, St. Felix was united with Fondo and became part of the Province of Trento (Trentino). It became independent again in 1947. In 1948, St. Felix became part of the predominantly German-speaking Province of South Tyrol. Until then, the provincial border was the Gampen Pass (Italian Passo delle Palade). Afterwards, the border was moved south of St. Felix.

The two neighboring municipalities of St. Felix and Unsere Liebe Frau im Walde were merged in 1974.

Juridically, St. Felix belonged to the district court of Fondo until 1964. In 1970, it fell under the authority of the district court of Meran.

Originally, St. Felix belonged to the parish of Fondo. In 1693, the provost of the monastery Gries assigned the burial place St. Christoph and its church to the Caseidians.

The church of St. Christoph is situated between St. Felix and Unsere Liebe Frau im Walde and was built around 1500 on the sight of a much earlier church. The first building dates back to 1476. From 1723 to 1824, it was parochially part of the parish of Fondo and had its own curate. The parish church dedicated to the Saint Felix was built in 1742. The church tower was completed in 1758. In 1902 the church was renovated.

The town's saint's day, called the Felixentag (Felix Day), is celebrated on the last Sunday of August.

== Politics ==
The mayors of St. Felix from 1952 to 1974 were:

- Alois Geiser: 1952–1956
- Johann Weiss: 1956–1957
- Franz Geiser: 1957–1964
- Johann Weiss: 1964–1974
