= Unsere Liebe Frau im Walde-St. Felix =

- Comune
- Gemeinde Unsere Liebe Frau im Walde-St. Felix; Comune di Senale-San Felice
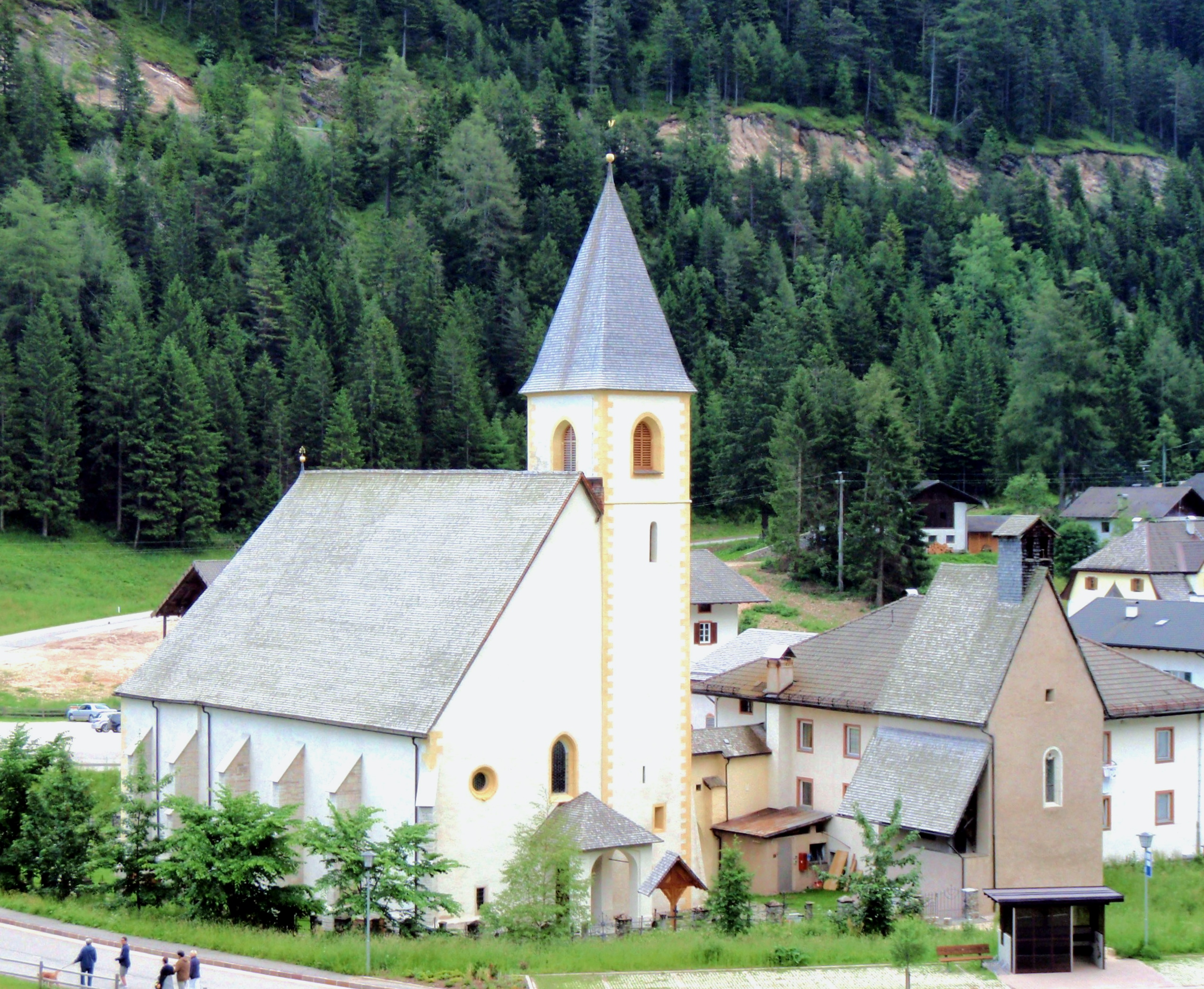
- Church in Unsere Liebe Frau

- Location within Italy Location within Trentino-Alto Adige/Südtirol
- Coordinates: 46°30′N 11°7′E
- Country: Italy
- Region: Trentino-Alto Adige/Südtirol
- Province: Bolzano
- Frazioni: Malgasott

Government
  - Mayor: Gabriela Kofler (SVP)

Area
  - Total: 27.5 km^{2} (10.6 sq mi)
- Elevation: 1,315 m (4,314 ft)

Population (2024)
  - Total: 790
  - Density: 29/km^{2} (74/sq mi)
- Demonym(s): German: Sankt Felixer; Italian: senalesi
- Time zone: UTC+1 (CET)
  - Summer (DST): UTC+2 (CEST)
- Postal code: 39010
- Dialing code: (+39) 463
- Website: Official website

Unsere Liebe Frau im Walde-St. Felix (German pronunciation: [ˈʊnsərə ˈliːbə fraʊ ʔɪm ˈvaldə saŋkt ˈfeːlɪks]; Italian: Senale-San Felice [seˈnaːle saɱ feˈliːtʃe]) is a comune (municipality) in South Tyrol in northern Italy, located about 20 kilometres (12 mi) west of the city of Bolzano.

== Geography ==
As of 2024, it had a population of 790 and an area of 27.5 square kilometres (10.6 mi^{2}).

The municipality of Unsere Liebe Frau im Walde-St. Felix contains the villages St. Felix, Unsere Liebe Frau im Walde and the hamlet Malgasott.

Unsere Liebe Frau im Walde-St. Felix borders the following municipalities: Eppan, Nals, St Pankraz, Tisens, Castelfondo, and Fondo.

== History ==
=== Coat-of-arms ===
The village has two coat-of-arms regarding the two joined municipalities. The shield is azure with an or square, the sides curved and the corners decorated with shamrock. The four vertices represent the four original German-speaking municipalities of Non Valley: Laurein, Proveis, Unsere Liebe Frau im Walde and St. Felix. The first emblem represents a church, the second St. Felix with a palm in the left hand and a book in the right. The emblem was adopted in 1966.

Anthropologist Eric R. Wolf examined the history of St. Felix in depth in his 1974 study The Hidden Frontier.

== Society ==
=== Linguistic distribution ===
According to the 2024 census, 97.42% of the population speak German, 2.44% Italian and 0.14% Ladin as first language.
