= Vittorio Erspamer =

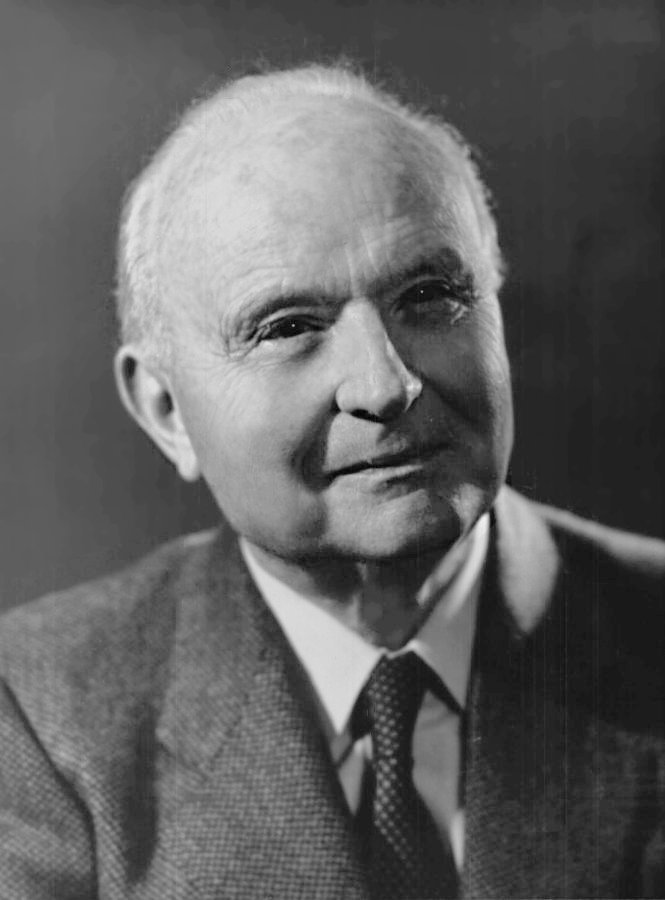
- Born: 30 July 1909; Malosco, Austria-Hungary
- Died: 25 October 1999 (aged 90); Rome, Italy
- Known for: Discoverer of serotonin and octopamine

Vittorio Erspamer (30 July 1909 – 25 October 1999) was an Italian pharmacologist and chemist, known for the identification, synthesis and pharmacological studies of more than sixty new chemical compounds, most notably serotonin and octopamine.

== Biography ==
Erspamer was born in 1909 in the small village of Val di Non in Malosco, a municipality of Trentino in northern Italy which was part of Austria-Hungary at the time. He attended school in the Roman Catholic Archdiocese of Trento and then moved to Pavia, where he studied at Ghislieri College, graduating in medicine and surgery in 1935. He then took the post of assistant professor in anatomy and physiology at the University of Pavia – one of the oldest universities in Europe, founded in 1361. In 1936, he obtained a scholarship to study at the Institute of Pharmacology at the University of Berlin. After returning to Italy in 1939, he moved to Rome where he took up the position of professor in pharmacology. In Rome, the focus of his research shifted to drugs and he used his past biological experience to focus on compounds isolated from animal tissues. In 1947 he became professor of pharmacology at the Faculty of Medicine at the University of Bari. In 1955, he moved from Bari to Parma, to assume an equivalent position of professor of pharmacology at the Faculty of Medicine, University of Parma. Erspamer was one of the first Italian pharmacologists to realize that fruitful scientific research benefits from building a relationship with the chemical and pharmaceutical industries. In the late 1950s, he established a collaboration with chemists at the Farmitalia company. The collaboration was useful, not only for the analysis of the structure of new molecules which he isolated and characterized pharmacologically, but also for the subsequent industrial synthesis of these chemicals and their synthetic analogs.

Thanks to funding received from Farmitalia, over the years Erspamer collected more than five hundred species of marine organisms from all around the world, including amphibians, shellfish, sea anemones and other species. For this purpose, he spent much time in traveling, and was known among his colleagues for his careful preparation of expeditions and knowledge of geography. Using these worldwide observations he developed a theory of geo-phylogenetic correlations among the different amphibian species of the world, which was based on analysis of the peptides and amines in their skin.

The research activities of Erspamer spanned more than 60 years and resulted in the isolation, identification, synthesis and pharmacological study of more than sixty new chemical compounds, especially polypeptides and biogenic amines, but also some alkaloids. Most of these compounds were isolated from animals, predominantly amphibians. In the late fifties his research shifted to peptides. In the laboratories of the Institute of Medical Pharmacology, University of Rome, he isolated from amphibians and mollusks more than fifty new bioactive peptides. These became the subjects of numerous studies in other laboratories in Europe and North America. In 1979, he focused on opioid peptides specific to Phyllomedusa, a genus of tree frog from Central and South America. These were used by the native Indians in initiation rites, to increase their prowess as "hunters" and make them feel "invincible". They applied secretions from the skin of these frogs that resulted in euphoric and analgesic effects. The peptides studied by Erspamer have become essential to characterize the functional role of opioid receptors.

Erspamer retired from administrative positions in 1984 because of the age limits, but continued his research and writing until his death in Rome in 1999. His last, unfinished review was completed by his collaborators and published in 2002. During his lifetime he was twice nominated for the Nobel Prize.

Erspamer was married to his long-time colleague (at least 1962-1999) Giuliana Falconieri Erspamer, who was among the committee members who organised a workshop held in his memory in 2009.

== Important discoveries ==
Between 1933 and 1934, while still a college student, Erspamer published his first work on the histochemical characteristics of enterochromaffin cells using advanced techniques, not normally used at that time, such as diazo reactions, Wood's lamp and fluorescence microscopy. In 1935, he showed that an extract prepared from enterochromaffin cells made intestinal tissue contract. Other chemists believed the extract contained adrenaline, but two years later Erspamer demonstrated that it was a previously unknown chemical, an amine, which he named enteramine. In 1948, Maurice M. Rapport, Arda Green, and Irvine Page of the Cleveland Clinic discovered a vasoconstrictor substance in blood serum, and since it was a serum agent affecting vascular tone, they named it serotonin. In 1952 it was shown that enteramine was the same substance as serotonin. Another important chemical, also an amine, was discovered by Erspamer in 1948, in the salivary glands of the octopus, and therefore named by him octopamine.
