= St. Pankraz, South Tyrol =

St. Pankraz
- Comune
- Gemeinde St. Pankraz; Comune di San Pancrazio
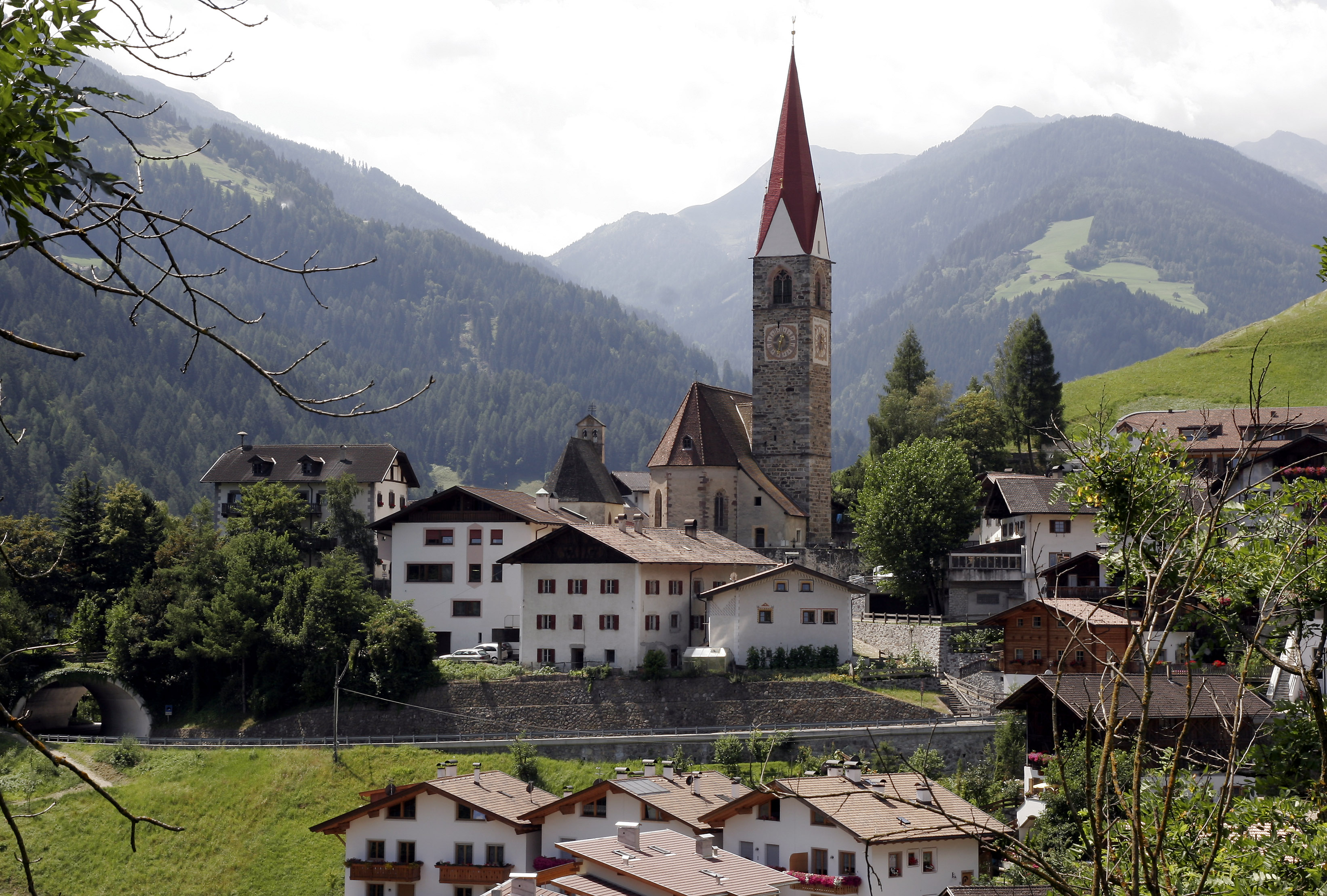
- View of Sankt Pankraz

- Location within Italy Location within Trentino-Alto Adige/Südtirol
- Coordinates: 46°35′N 11°5′E
- Country: Italy
- Region: Trentino-Alto Adige/Südtirol
- Province: South Tyrol (BZ)

Government
  - Mayor: Thomas Holzner

Area
  - Total: 63.1 km^{2} (24.4 sq mi)
- Elevation: 735 m (2,411 ft)

Population (Nov. 2010)
  - Total: 1,589
  - Density: 25.2/km^{2} (65.2/sq mi)
- Demonym(s): German: Pankrazer; Italian: di San Pancrazio
- Time zone: UTC+1 (CET)
  - Summer (DST): UTC+2 (CEST)
- Postal code: 39010
- Dialing code: 0473
- Patron saint: Saint Pancras
- Website: Official website

St. Pankraz (German pronunciation: [saŋkt ˈpaŋkrats]; Italian: San Pancrazio [sam paŋˈkrattsjo]) is a comune (municipality) in South Tyrol in northern Italy, located about 20 kilometres (12 mi) northwest of the city of Bolzano.

== Geography ==
As of 30 November 2010, it had a population of 1,589 and an area of 63.1 square kilometres (24.4 mi^{2}).

Sankt Pankraz borders the following municipalities: Lana, Laurein, Naturns, Unsere Liebe Frau im Walde-St. Felix, Tisens, Ulten, and Castelfondo.

== History ==
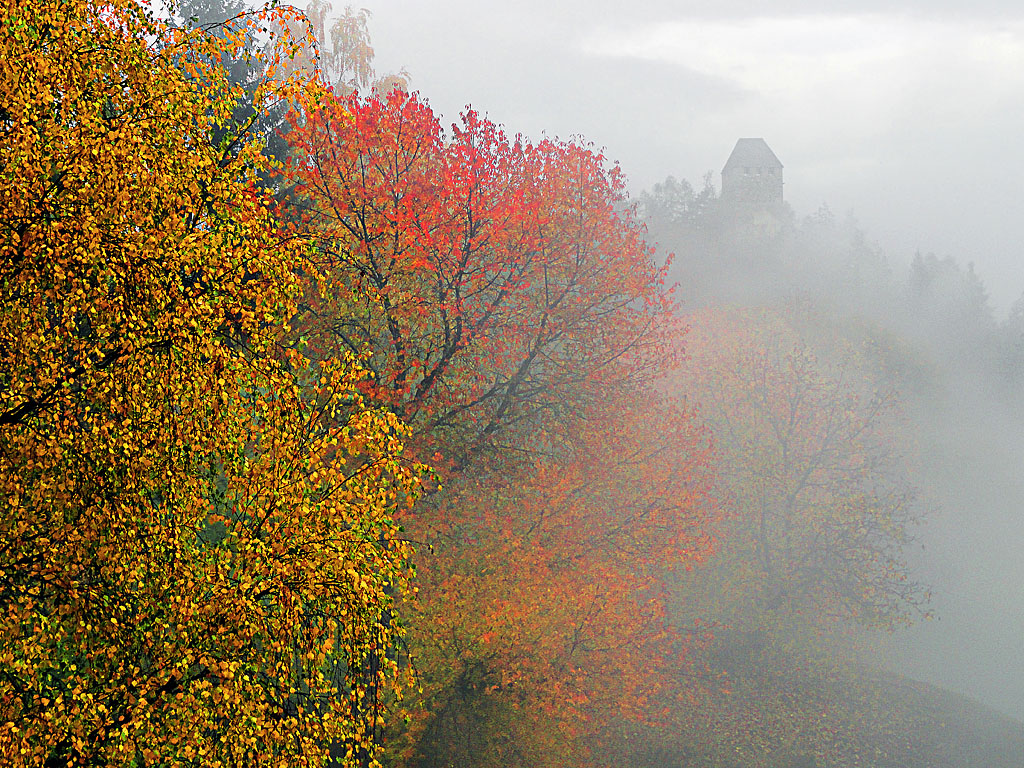
Eschenlohe castle

=== Coat-of-arms ===
The emblem represents a tower with battlements, with a pavilion azure roof, surrounded by a wall above a vert hill with two fir-trees on each side on argent. The castle tower corresponds to the Eschenloch Castle built in the twelfth century by the Counts of Ulten. The emblem was adopted in 1968.

== Society ==
=== Linguistic distribution ===
According to the 2024 census, 98.99% of the population spoke German, 0.95% Italian and 0.07% Ladin as their first language.

=== Demographic evolution ===
Historical population

Year	Pop.	±%
1900	?	—
1910	1,843	—
1921	1,562	−15.2%
1931	1,646	+5.4%

Year	Pop.	±%
1936	1,707	+3.7%
1951	1,694	−0.8%
1961	1,871	+10.4%
1971	1,865	−0.3%

Year	Pop.	±%
1981	1,786	−4.2%
1991	1,620	−9.3%
2001	1,608	−0.7%

Source: Data from ISTAT

== Personalities ==
- Blasius Marsoner (1924–1991), poet, historian and translator of the Divine Comedy of Dante Alighieri
