= Ronzone =

- Comune
- Comune di Ronzone
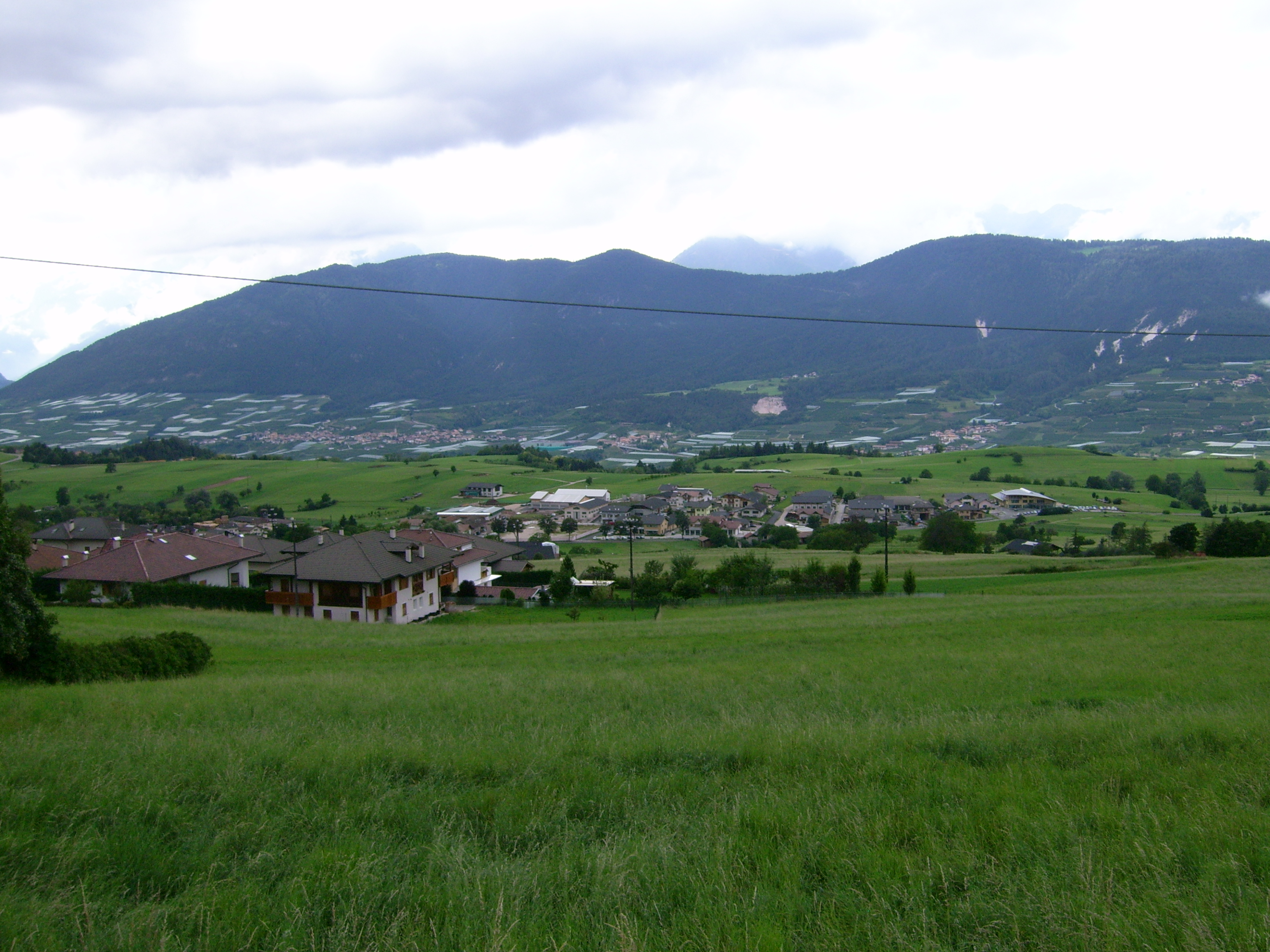

- Location within Italy Location within Trentino-Alto Adige/Südtirol
- Coordinates: 46°25′N 11°9′E
- Country: Italy
- Region: Trentino-Alto Adige/Südtirol
- Province: Trentino (TN)

Government
  - Mayor: Stefano Endrizzi

Area
  - Total: 5.3 km^{2} (2.0 sq mi)

Population (Dec. 2004)
  - Total: 369
  - Density: 70/km^{2} (180/sq mi)
- Time zone: UTC+1 (CET)
  - Summer (DST): UTC+2 (CEST)
- Postal code: 38010
- Dialing code: 0463
- Website: Official website

Ronzone (Renzón in local dialect) is a comune (municipality) in Trentino in the northern Italian region Trentino-Alto Adige/Südtirol, located about 40 kilometres (25 mi) north of Trento. As of 31 December 2004, it had a population of 369 and an area of 5.3 square kilometres (2.0 mi^{2}).

Ronzone borders the following municipalities: Fondo, Malosco, Sarnonico and Eppan.

== Demographic evolution ==
Historical population

Year	Pop.	±%
1861	?	—
1871	?	—
1881	?	—
1901	?	—
1911	?	—

Year	Pop.	±%
1921	554	—
1931	500	−9.7%
1936	452	−9.6%
1951	421	−6.9%
1961	413	−1.9%

Year	Pop.	±%
1971	388	−6.1%
1981	380	−2.1%
1991	336	−11.6%
2001	352	+4.8%

Source: Data from ISTAT
