= Tisens =

- Comune
- Gemeinde Tisens; Comune di Tesimo
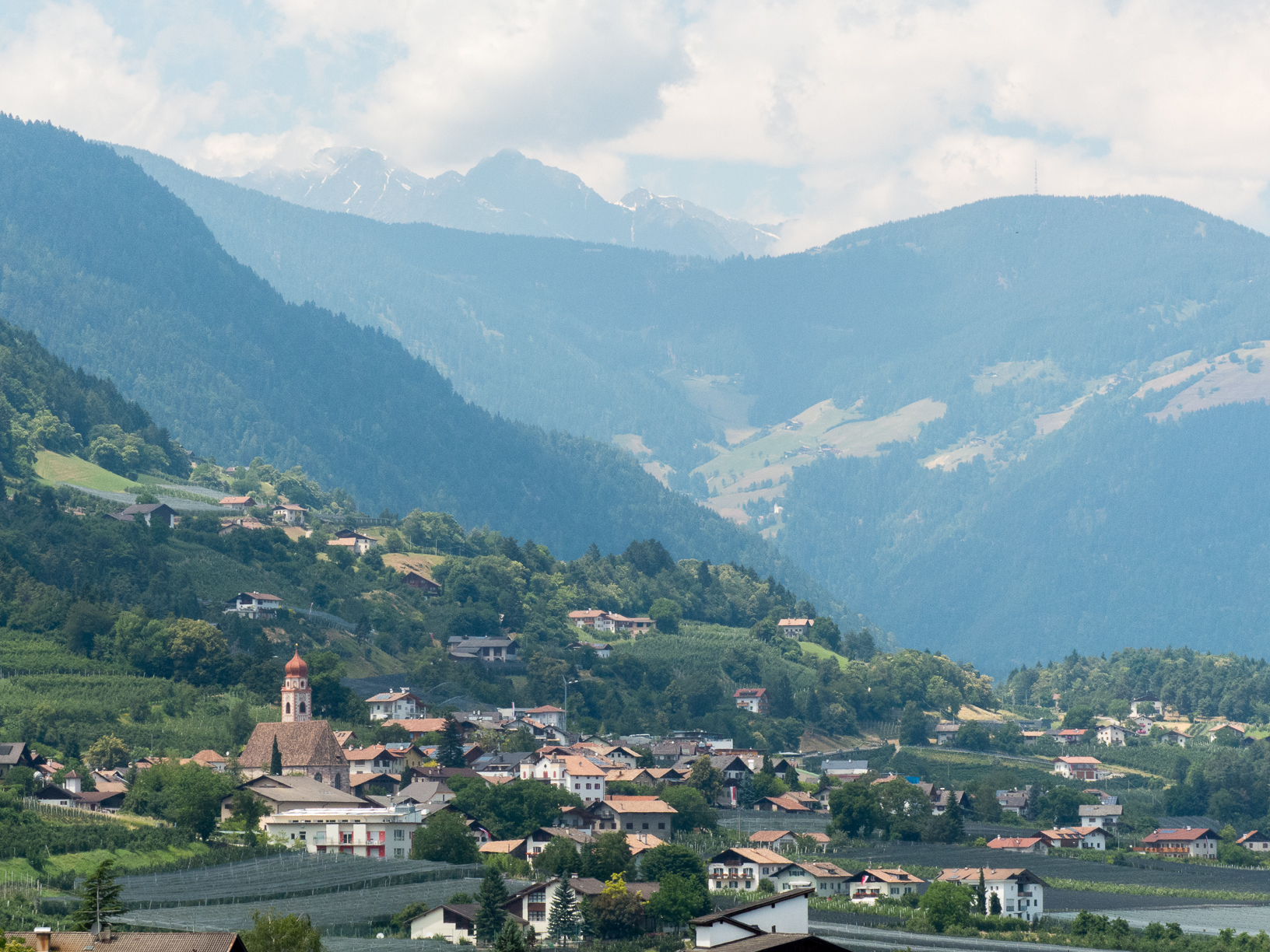
- General view of Tisens

- Location within Italy Location within Trentino-Alto Adige/Südtirol
- Coordinates: 46°34′N 11°10′E
- Country: Italy
- Region: Trentino-Alto Adige/Südtirol
- Province: South Tyrol (BZ)
- Frazioni: Gfrill (Caprile), Grissian (Grissiano), Naraun (Narano), Platzers (Plazzoles), Prissian (Prissiano), Schernag

Government
  - Mayor: Christoph Holzner (SVP)

Area
  - Total: 38.1 km^{2} (14.7 sq mi)
- Elevation: 635 m (2,083 ft)

Population (Nov. 2010)
  - Total: 1,845
  - Density: 48.4/km^{2} (125/sq mi)
- Demonym(s): German: Tisener; Italian: tesimesi
- Time zone: UTC+1 (CET)
  - Summer (DST): UTC+2 (CEST)
- Postal code: 39010
- Dialing code: 0473
- Website: Official website

Tisens (German: [ˈtiːsn̩s]; Italian: Tesimo [ˈteːzimo]) is a comune (municipality) in South Tyrol in northern Italy, located about 15 kilometres (9 mi) northwest of the city of Bolzano.

The commune is home to Katzenzungen Castle which harbors a 350+ year old vine of the Italian wine grape variety Versoaln that is considered one of the world's oldest and largest single grapevines in existence.

== Geography ==
As of 30 November 2010, it had a population of 1,845 and an area of 38.1 square kilometres (14.7 mi^{2}).

The municipality of Tisens contains the frazioni (subdivisions, mainly villages and hamlets) Gfrill (Caprile), Grissian (Grissiano), Naraun (Narano), Platzers (Plazzoles), Prissian (Prissiano), and Schernag.

Tisens borders the following municipalities: Gargazon, Lana, Nals, St. Pankraz, and Unsere Liebe Frau im Walde-St. Felix.

== History ==
=== Coat-of-arms ===
The shield is quartering of argent and gules; in the first and fourth part is a rose gules, in the second and third a sable erect bear. It is the coat of Family Frank who managed the village from 1551 until 1743. The emblem was granted in 1966.

== Society ==
=== Linguistic distribution ===
According to the 2024 census, 96.62% of the population speak German, 3.10% Italian and 0.28% Ladin as first language.

=== Demographic evolution ===
Historical population

Year	Pop.	±%
1860	?	—
1870	?	—
1880	1,591	—
1900	?	—
1910	1,662	—

Year	Pop.	±%
1921	1,329	−20.0%
1931	1,602	+20.5%
1936	1,637	+2.2%
1951	1,630	−0.4%
1961	1,708	+4.8%

Year	Pop.	±%
1971	1,707	−0.1%
1981	1,687	−1.2%
1991	1,721	+2.0%
2001	1,809	+5.1%

Source: Data from ISTAT
