= Malosco =

- Comune
- Comune di Malosco
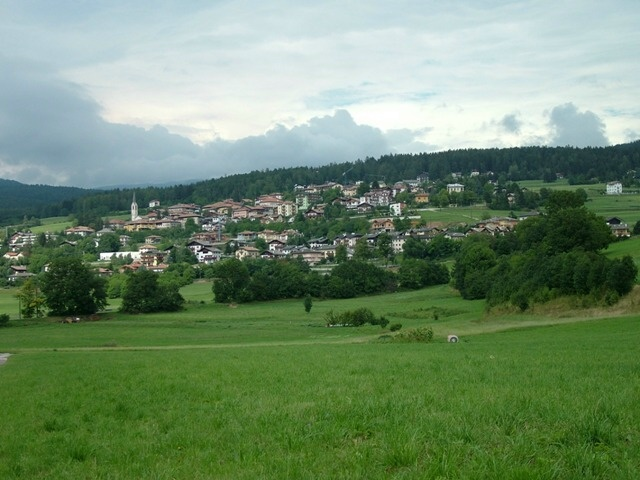

- Location within Italy Location within Trentino-Alto Adige/Südtirol
- Coordinates: 46°26′N 11°9′E
- Country: Italy
- Region: Trentino-Alto Adige/Südtirol
- Province: Trentino (TN)

Government
  - Mayor: Walter Clauser

Area
  - Total: 6.8 km^{2} (2.6 sq mi)
- Elevation: 1,041 m (3,415 ft)

Population (31 December 2010)
  - Total: 453
  - Density: 67/km^{2} (170/sq mi)
- Demonym: Maloschesi
- Time zone: UTC+1 (CET)
  - Summer (DST): UTC+2 (CEST)
- Postal code: 38013
- Dialing code: 0463
- Website: Official website

Malosco (Malós-c in local dialect) was a comune (municipality) in Trentino in the northern Italian region Trentino-Alto Adige/Südtirol, located about 54 kilometres (34 mi) north of Trento. On 1 January 2020, it was merged with the municipalities of Castelfondo and Fondo to create the comune of Borgo d'Anaunia.

== History ==
Malosco was occupied in ancient times, testament to the abundance of Roman coins and other artifacts unearthed in the area and it had an important status among the nobility. The parish church of Saint Tecla in the main town dates back to 1228. Casa Nesler is decorated with a fresco and the coat-of-arms of the Guarienti family, prominent in the area, and is dated to 1576. Numerous other old noble houses are located in the main town. The area that is now Malosco, Ronzone, Sejo and Sarnonico was approved by Charter by Cardinal Ludovico Madruzzo, Prince-Bishop of the Bishopric of Trento.

In 2003, Malosco was the meeting site of an international group of scholars of children's and family services that developed a plan for comparative international research on child and family community based centers.

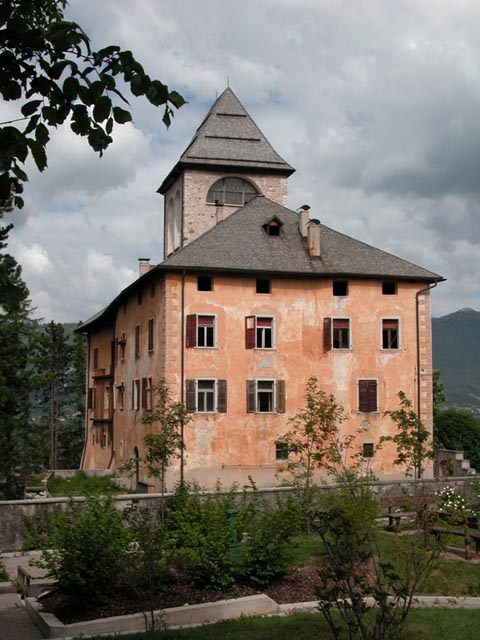
Malosco Castle

Malosco Castle

Malosco Castle (originally dated to the 12th century) was rebuilt in 1593 by Count Gerolamo Guarienti. The line of the Lords of Castle Malosco ended after the death of Guarienti. It was used as a district court and offices at one point. It was also the residence of the Vicedomini Judge of Val di Non, commander of the Imperial Austrian royal court.

== Geography ==
Malosco is located along the SS42 road in northeastern Italy in the Trentino-Alto Adige/Südtirol region. Although the main road at the point of the town is the SS42 however, it is the SS238 road which is the main road of access from the north which leads down from Marling and it is the SS43 road which connects it to Lago di Santa Giustina in the southwest, a road which joins the A22 road (European Route 45) at San Michele all'Adige to the southeast. Malosco is located on the sloping plateau on the left bank of the Sas River, an average 1,041 metres (3,415 ft) above the sea level. The stream Novella is nearby.

Malosco is within walking distance of Fondo, the two towns being adjacent to each other with Fondo lying in the northwest. In addition to Fondo, Malosco also borders the municipalities of Ronzone, Sarnonico and Eppan. The Dasine woods and meadows are located to the north of the main town. Lago di Santa Giustina, which is several kilometres to the southwest.

== Fauna and flora ==
The area is characterized by grassland.

== Agriculture ==
The land is fertile, producing wine, mulberries, Turkish corn, wheat, rye, barley, and potatoes.

== Facilities ==
Pénegal (1,737 metres (5,699 ft)) can be reached in about 2.3 hours from Malosco, and north of the main centre is winter cross country skiing facilities with over 10 kilometres (6.2 mi) of slopes. Malosco also contains a playground, tennis courts, a volleyball and basketball courts, and a multipurpose sports field. The City Hall is located at the Piazza Vittorio Erspamer.

== People ==
- Fortunato Depero (1892–1960) Italian artist and a leading exponent of Futurism.
- Vittorio Erspamer (1909–1999) -Italian pharmacologist and chemist.
