= Borgo d'Anaunia =

- Comune
- Comune di Borgo d'Anaunia
- Location within Italy Location within Trentino-Alto Adige/Südtirol
- Coordinates: 45°53′23.01″N 11°8′9.66″E
- Country: Italy
- Region: Trentino-Alto Adige/Südtirol
- Province: Trentino (TN)

Government
  - Mayor: Daniele Graziadei

Area
  - Total: 63.23 km^{2} (24.41 sq mi)

Population (2026)
  - Total: 2,601
  - Density: 41.14/km^{2} (106.5/sq mi)
- Time zone: UTC+1 (CET)
  - Summer (DST): UTC+2 (CEST)
- Dialing code: 0463
- Website: Official website

Borgo d'Anaunia is a comune (municipality) in the Province of Trentino in the Italian region Trentino-Alto Adige/Südtirol. It was established on 1 January 2020 by the merger of the municipalities of Castelfondo, Fondo and Malosco.
