= Nals =

- Comune
- Gemeinde Nals; Comune di Nalles
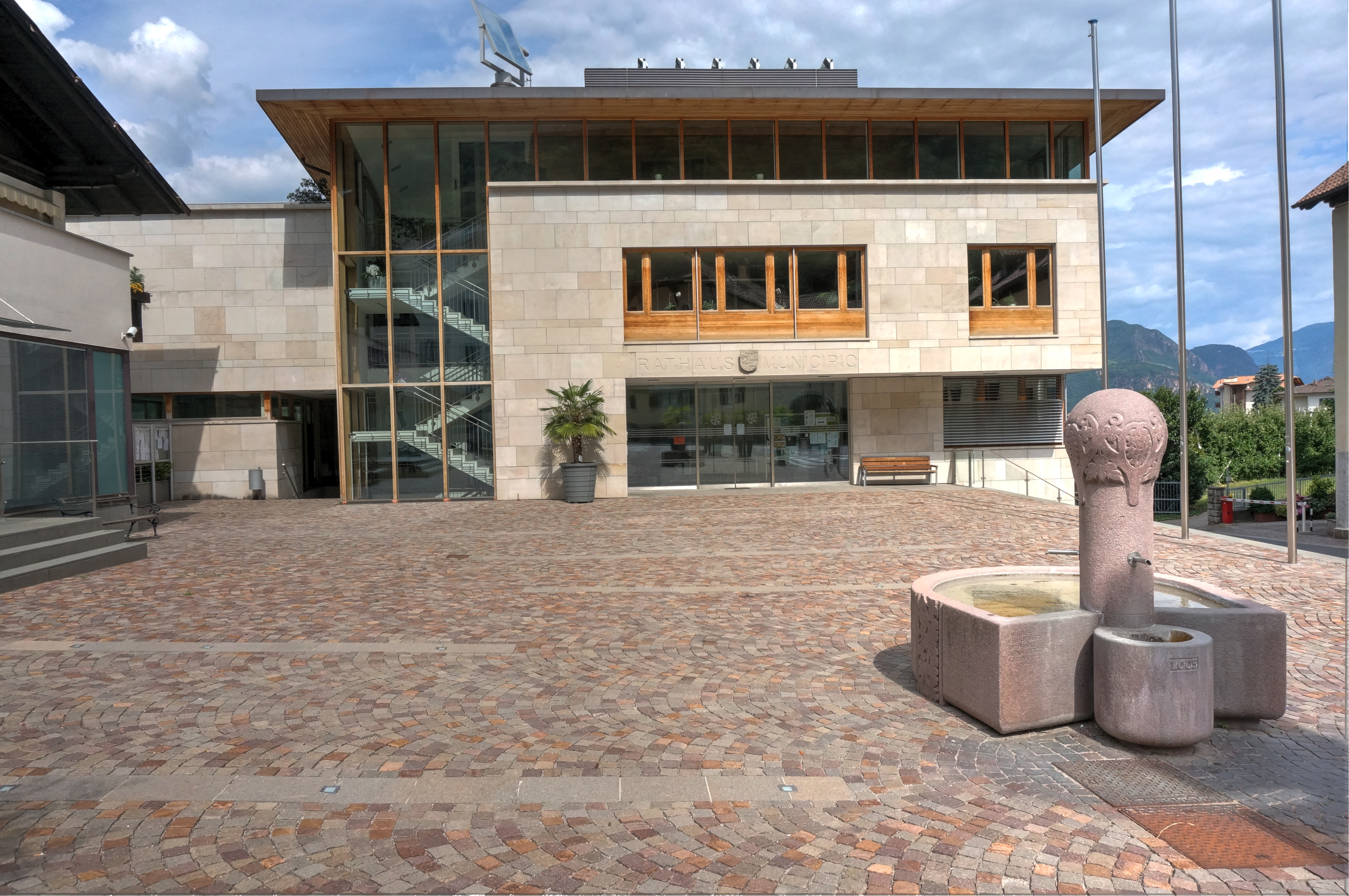
- Town hall of Nals

- Location within Italy Location within Trentino-Alto Adige/Südtirol
- Coordinates: 46°33′N 11°12′E
- Country: Italy
- Region: Trentino-Alto Adige/Südtirol
- Province: South Tyrol (BZ)
- Frazioni: Sirmian (Sirmiano)

Government
  - Mayor: Eduard Gasser (SVP)

Area
  - Total: 12.3 km^{2} (4.7 sq mi)
- Elevation: 321 m (1,053 ft)

Population (Nov. 2010)
  - Total: 1,815
  - Density: 148/km^{2} (382/sq mi)
- Demonym(s): German: Nalser; Italian: nalesini
- Time zone: UTC+1 (CET)
  - Summer (DST): UTC+2 (CEST)
- Postal code: 39010
- Dialing code: 0471
- Website: Official website

Nals (German pronunciation: [nals]; Italian: Nalles [ˈnalles]) is a comune (municipality) and a village in the province of South Tyrol in northern Italy, located about 13 kilometres (8 mi) northwest of the city of Bolzano.

== Geography ==
As of 30 November 2010, it had a population of 1,815 and an area of 12.3 square kilometres (4.7 mi^{2}).

Nals borders the following municipalities: Andrian, Eppan, Gargazon, Unsere Liebe Frau im Walde-St. Felix, Terlan, and Tisens.

=== Frazioni ===
The municipality of Nals contains the frazione (subdivision) Sirmian (Sirmiano).

== History ==
=== Coat-of-arms ===
The shield is parted quarterly: the first and fourth quarter represent, in a mirror-like manner, a sable ox on argent; the second and third, always as a mirror-like image, represents an argent swan on azure. These are the arms of the Lords of Boymont-Payrsberg who owned the Schwanburg and Payrsberg Castles. The coat of arms was granted in 1967.

== Society ==
=== Linguistic distribution ===
According to the 2024 census, 88.96% of the population speak German, 10.31% Italian and 0.73% Ladin as first language.

=== Demographic evolution ===
Historical population

Year	Pop.	±%
1860	?	—
1870	?	—
1880	540	—
1900	?	—
1910	655	—

Year	Pop.	±%
1921	806	+23.1%
1931	873	+8.3%
1936	953	+9.2%
1951	999	+4.8%
1961	997	−0.2%

Year	Pop.	±%
1971	1,232	+23.6%
1981	1,287	+4.5%
1991	1,413	+9.8%
2001	1,577	+11.6%

Source: Data from ISTAT
