= George McAnthony =

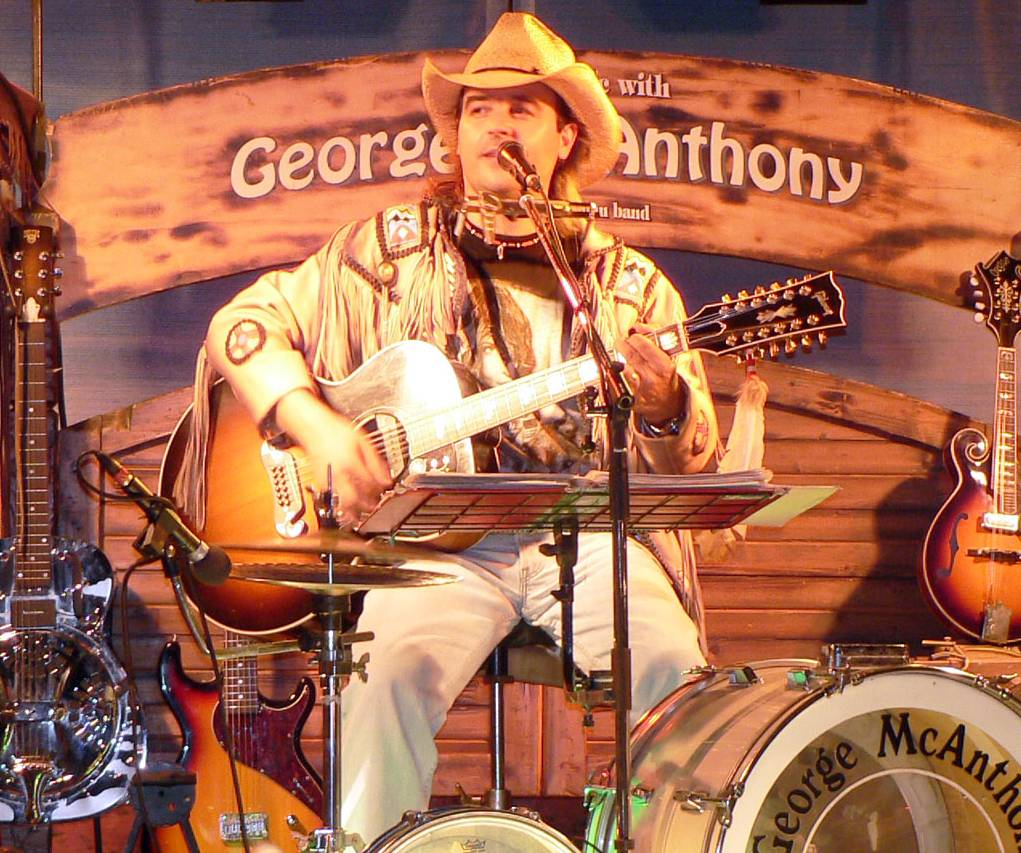

Background information
- Birth name: Georg Spitaler
- Born: 6 April 1966; Eppan an der Weinstraße, South Tyrol, Italy
- Died: 8 July 2011 (aged 45); Terracina, Italy
- Genres: Country
- Occupation(s): Singer, songwriter
- Instrument(s): Guitar, dobro, mandolin, harmonica, kazoo, drum, snare, tambourine, hi-hat
- Website: www.mcanthony.it

George McAnthony (6 April 1966 – 8 July 2011), born Georg Spitaler, was a country singer and songwriter. From 1988 he toured around Italy, Austria, Germany, Switzerland and France.

McAnthony was born and raised in Eppan an der Weinstraße, South Tyrol, Italy, where he resided until his death. He recorded fourteen albums, three of them in Nashville. McAnthony performed as a "Country One Man Band", playing seven acoustic instruments at the same time, live, without backing or support from other musicians. He played 12-string guitar, dobro, mandolin or electric guitar, harmonica and kazoo. With his feet he played percussion instruments such as bass drum, snare, tambourine and hi-hat.

At the peak of his career, McAnthony performed a duet with John Denver and appeared in many radio and TV broadcasting shows. He won three internationally recognized awards: "Best European Country Artist of the year", "Best European Male Vocalist of the Year", and "Best European Country Song of the Year".

Among other things he conducted the weekly program Country Time on the German speaking Radio Channel RAI Sender Bozen.

Outside of his music career, McAnthony was dedicated to charity projects.

McAnthony's thirteenth CD, "Bridge To El Dorado", was given airtime on the international radio network by "Comstock Records USA", and came in second place at the European Country Music Awards 2009 in the Category "Best European Album of the Year". In April 2010 George McAnthony recorded his fourteenth album "Dust Off My Boots" in Nashville, Tennessee, with Brent Mason, Paul Franklin and Bryan Sutton.

McAnthony died of myocardial infarction on 8 July 2011 in Terracina, Italy.

On Saturday, 30 May 2015, the city of Eppan organized the Second Tribute Concert for George McAnthony which saw the participation of several European country artists against the backdrop of a big festival right in the center of town to which many locals, but also non-locals, attended.

== Awards ==
- European Country Music Award – Best European Country Vocalist of the Year 1998
- European Country Music Award – Best European Country Artist & Song of The Year 2001

== Discography ==
- Country & Western Collection (2011)
- Dust Off My Boots (2010)
- Bridge To El Dorado (2008)
- Trail of Life (2006)
- Best of 1997–2005 (2005)
- Great Spirit (2004)
- Wild Horse Running (2002)
- The Vision (2000)
- 22 Greatest Hits 1988–97 (2000)
- Weekend Cowboy (1998)
- Like a Country Boy (1996)
- Live on the Road (1994)
- Country Way of Life (1992)
- Together (1990)
- Green is Peace (1989)
