= Castelfondo =

- Comune
- Comune di Castelfondo
- Coat of arms

- Location within Italy Location within Trentino-Alto Adige/Südtirol
- Coordinates: 46°27′N 11°7′E
- Country: Italy
- Region: Trentino-Alto Adige/Südtirol
- Province: Trentino (TN)

Government
  - Mayor: Nadia Ianes

Area
  - Total: 25.8 km^{2} (10.0 sq mi)
- Elevation: 948 m (3,110 ft)

Population (Dec. 2004)
  - Total: 633
  - Density: 24.5/km^{2} (63.5/sq mi)
- Time zone: UTC+1 (CET)
  - Summer (DST): UTC+2 (CEST)
- Postal code: 38020
- Dialing code: 0463

Castelfondo (Nones: Cjastelfón) was a comune (municipality) in Trentino in the northern Italian region Trentino-Alto Adige/Südtirol, located about 45 kilometres (28 mi) north of Trento. On 1 January 2020, it was merged with the municipalities of Fondo and Malosco to create the comune of Borgo d'Anaunia.

== Geography ==
As of 31 December 2004, it had a population of 624 and an area of 25.8 square kilometres (10.0 mi^{2}).

Castelfondo borders the following municipalities: Brez, Fondo, St. Pankraz, Unsere Liebe Frau im Walde-St. Felix and Laurein.

== Demographic evolution ==
Historical population

Year	Pop.	±%
1861	?	—
1871	?	—
1881	?	—
1901	?	—
1911	?	—

Year	Pop.	±%
1921	1,037	—
1931	886	−14.6%
1936	797	−10.0%
1951	928	+16.4%
1961	924	−0.4%

Year	Pop.	±%
1971	784	−15.2%
1981	718	−8.4%
1991	632	−12.0%
2001	618	−2.2%

Source: Data from ISTAT
