= Eppan an der Weinstraße =

Eppan
- Comune
- Gemeinde Eppan an der Weinstraße; Comune di Appiano sulla Strada del Vino
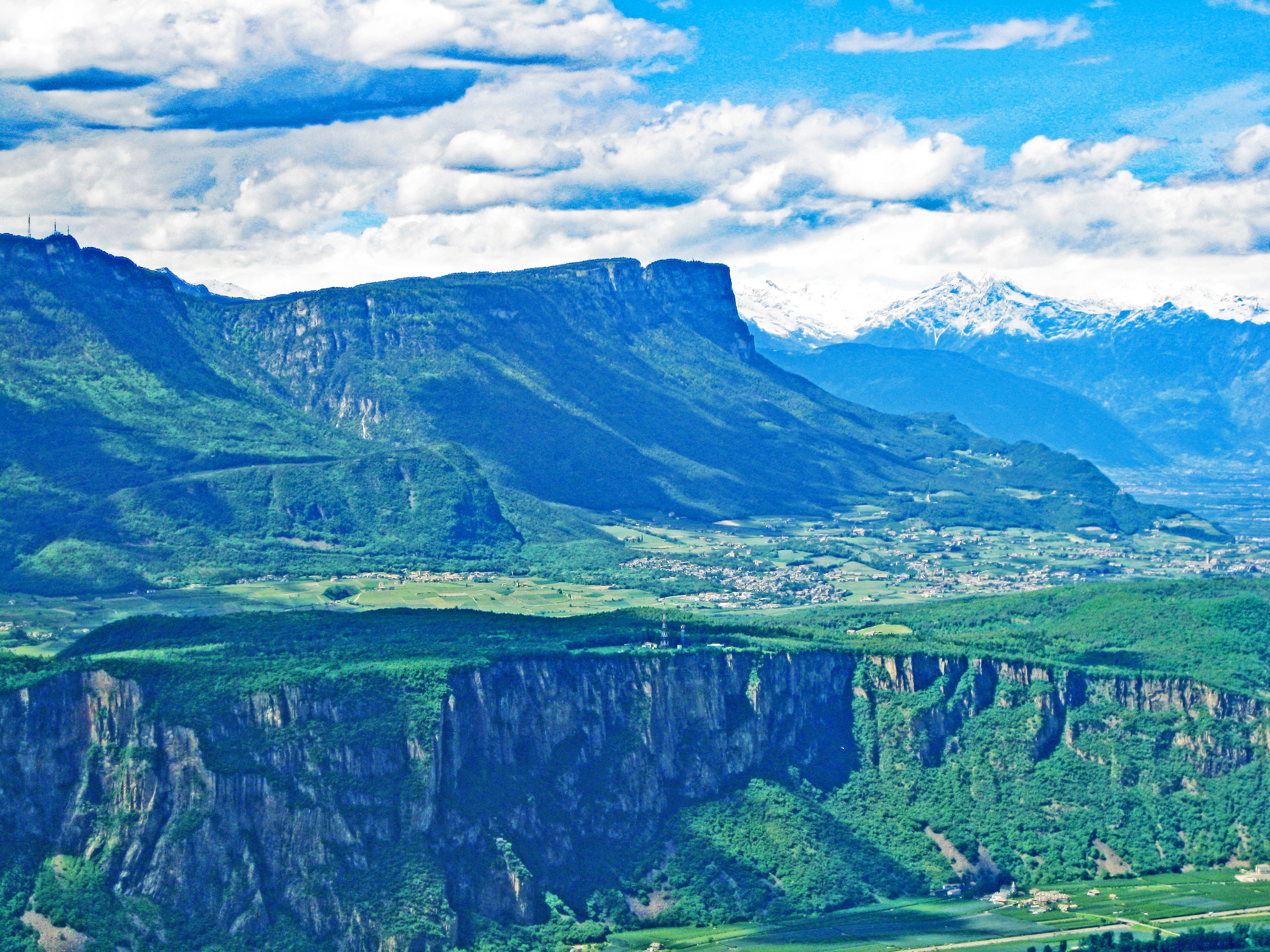
- View of Eppan an der Weinstraße

- Flag Coat of arms

- Location within Italy Location within Trentino-Alto Adige/Südtirol
- Coordinates: 46°27′N 11°16′E
- Country: Italy
- Region: Trentino-Alto Adige/Südtirol
- Province: South Tyrol (BZ)
- Frazioni: Berg (Monte), Frangart (Frangarto), Girlan (Cornaiano), Missian (Missiano), Montiggl (Monticolo), Perdonig (Predonico), St. Michael (San Michele), St. Pauls (San Paolo), Unterrain (Riva di Sotto)

Government
  - Mayor: Lorenz Ebner (SVP)

Area ISTAT
  - Total: 59.7 km^{2} (23.1 sq mi)
- Elevation: 239 m (784 ft)

Population (Nov. 2026)
  - Total: 15,096
  - Rank: 742nd in Italy
  - Density: 253/km^{2} (655/sq mi)
- Demonym(s): German: Eppaner; Italian: appianesi
- Time zone: UTC+1 (CET)
  - Summer (DST): UTC+2 (CEST)
- Postal code: 39057
- Dialing code: 0471
- Climate: Humid subtropical climate (Cfa)
- GDP per capita: €64,373 (Regional)
- Saint day: 29 September
- Website: Official website

Eppan an der Weinstraße (Austrian German: [ˈɛpan an deːɐ̯ ˈvaɪnˌʃtraːsɛ]; Italian: Appiano sulla Strada del Vino [apˈpjaːno sulla ˈstraːda del ˈviːno]), often abbreviated to Eppan or Appiano, is a comune (municipality) in South Tyrol in northern Italy, located about 8 kilometres (5 mi) southwest of the city of Bolzano.

== History ==
=== Coat-of-arms ===
The emblem represents the coat-of-arms of the Hocheppan castle owned by the Lords of Eppan since the 11th century. In the left side it is depicted half star with eight rays and the crescent moon to the right, both of or on azure background. The emblem was adopted in 1967.

== Geography ==
As of 31 May 2026, it had a population of 15 096 and an area of 59.7 square kilometres (23.1 mi^{2}).

Eppan borders the following municipalities: Andrian, Bolzano, Kaltern, Nals, Terlan, Unsere Liebe Frau im Walde-St. Felix, Vadena, Cavareno, Fondo, Malosco, Sarnonico, and Ronzone.

=== Frazioni ===
The municipality of Eppan contains the frazioni (subdivisions, mainly villages and hamlets) Frangart (Frangarto), Girlan (Cornaiano), Missian (Missiano), Montiggl (Monticolo), Perdonig (Predonico), St. Michael (San Michele), St. Pauls (San Paolo), Unterrain (Riva di Sotto).

=== Climate ===
Climate data for Eppan an der Weinstraße (Appiano sulla Strada del Vino)
Month	Jan	Feb	Mar	Apr	May	Jun	Jul	Aug	Sep	Oct	Nov	Dec	Year
Mean daily maximum °C (°F)	6.8 (44.2)	10.1 (50.2)	15.6 (60.1)	20.1 (68.2)	24.5 (76.1)	28.4 (83.1)	30.2 (86.4)	29.5 (85.1)	24.5 (76.1)	18.5 (65.3)	11.8 (53.2)	6.8 (44.2)	18.9 (66.0)
Daily mean °C (°F)	2.4 (36.3)	4.8 (40.6)	9.7 (49.5)	13.9 (57.0)	18.2 (64.8)	22.1 (71.8)	23.9 (75.0)	23.3 (73.9)	18.7 (65.7)	13.4 (56.1)	7.3 (45.1)	2.9 (37.2)	13.4 (56.1)
Mean daily minimum °C (°F)	−2.0 (28.4)	−0.5 (31.1)	3.8 (38.8)	7.7 (45.9)	11.9 (53.4)	15.8 (60.4)	17.6 (63.7)	17.1 (62.8)	12.9 (55.2)	8.3 (46.9)	2.8 (37.0)	−1.0 (30.2)	7.9 (46.2)
Average precipitation mm (inches)	16.0 (0.63)	15.0 (0.59)	28.0 (1.10)	42.0 (1.65)	58.0 (2.28)	67.0 (2.64)	61.0 (2.40)	59.0 (2.32)	47.0 (1.85)	48.0 (1.89)	50.0 (1.97)	24.0 (0.94)	515.0 (20.28)
Mean monthly sunshine hours	125.0	152.0	198.0	215.0	258.0	282.0	310.0	288.0	230.0	185.0	128.0	111.0	2,482
Source: Landeswetterdienst Südtirol

== Economy ==
Eppan an der Weinstraße is an affluent municipality in South Tyrol, Italy, known for its one highest standard of living, historic castles, and vast vineyards. It is wealthy residential and wine-making region where many upscale manors and estates are located.

== Politics ==
=== Mayors ===
Mayors since 1952
Mayor	Term
Friedrich Dellago	1952–1977
Erwin Walcher	1977–1990
Franz Lintner	1990–2010
Wilfried Trettl	2010–2025
Lorenz Ebner	since 2025

=== Parliamentary elections ===
In elections to the Italian Parliament, Eppan belongs to the Chamber of Deputies constituency of Bozen (a Chamber constituency named Eppan constituency existed from 1993 to 2005) and to the Senate constituency of Bozen.

== Sights ==
The Überetsch is the region with the highest density of castles in Europe. In the area around Eppan, there are over 200 historically significant architectural structures, including castles, palaces, Ansitzes (manor houses), churches, and chapels. About 20 of these are major castles and palaces. The village centers also consist of numerous historic buildings.

=== Castles and Manors ===
- Hocheppan Castle with the Hocheppan Castle Chapel
- Ansitz Moos-Schulthaus (Museum of Medieval Housing Culture)
- Boymont Castle (ruins)
- Schloss Englar (guesthouse)
- Schloss Korb (luxury hotel)
- Warth Castle (holiday apartments)
- Freudenstein Castle (congress center)
- Sigmundskron Castle (Messner Mountain Museum, belongs to the municipality of Bozen)
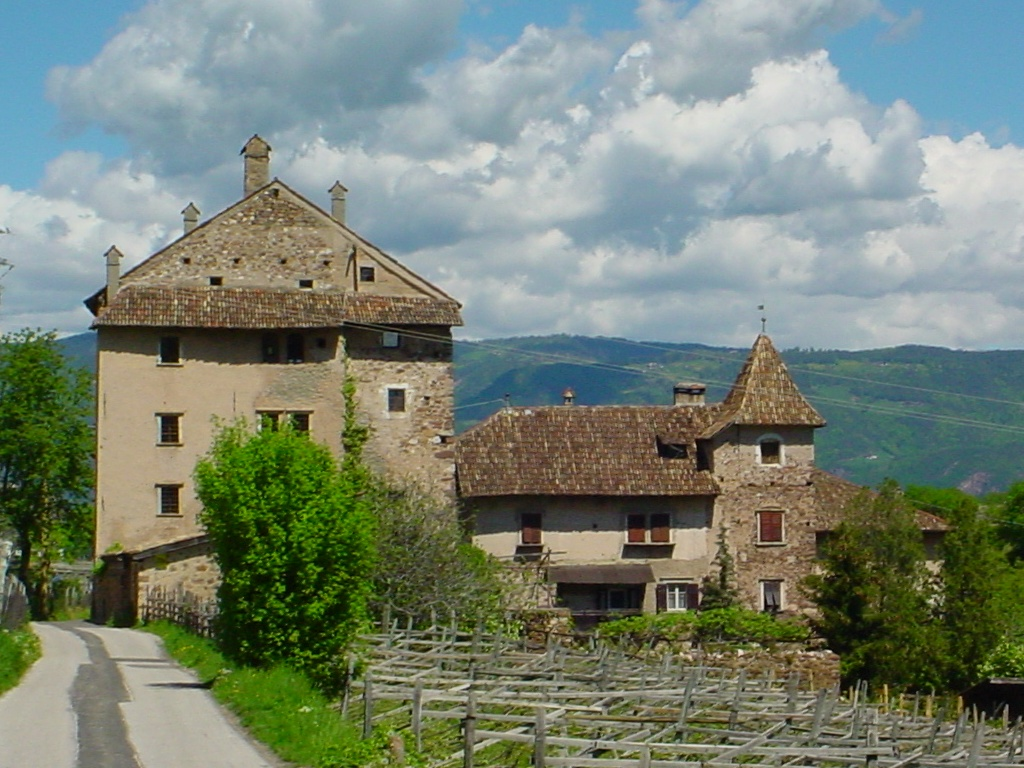
Ansitz Moos-Schulthaus

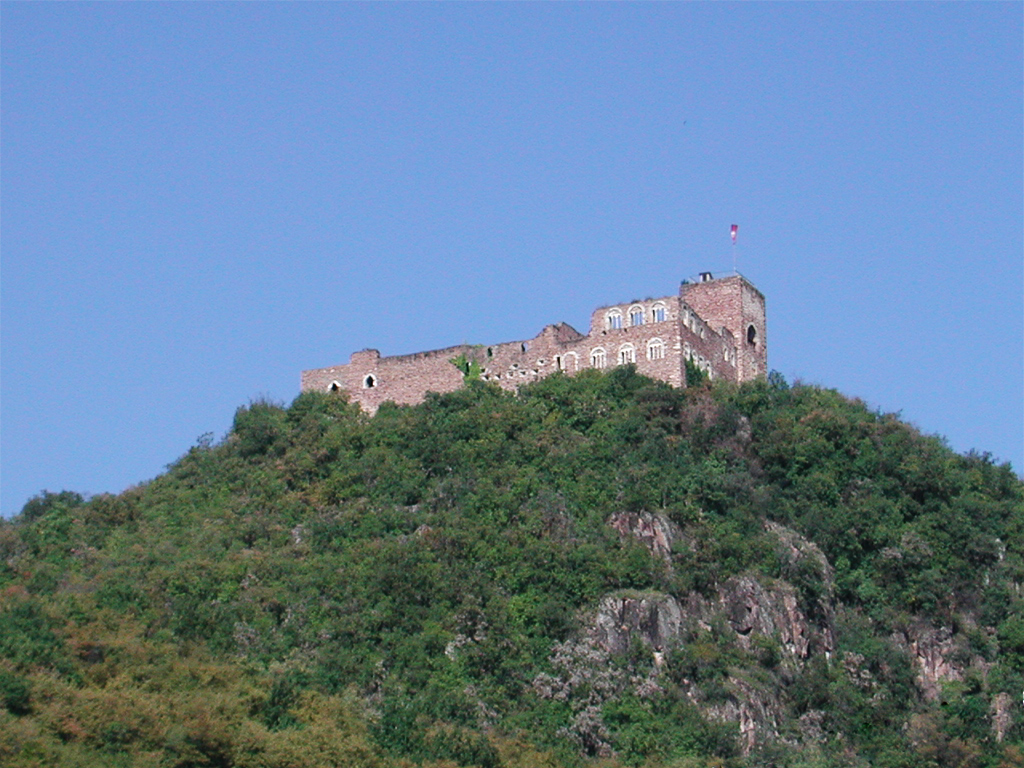
Boymont Castle ruins

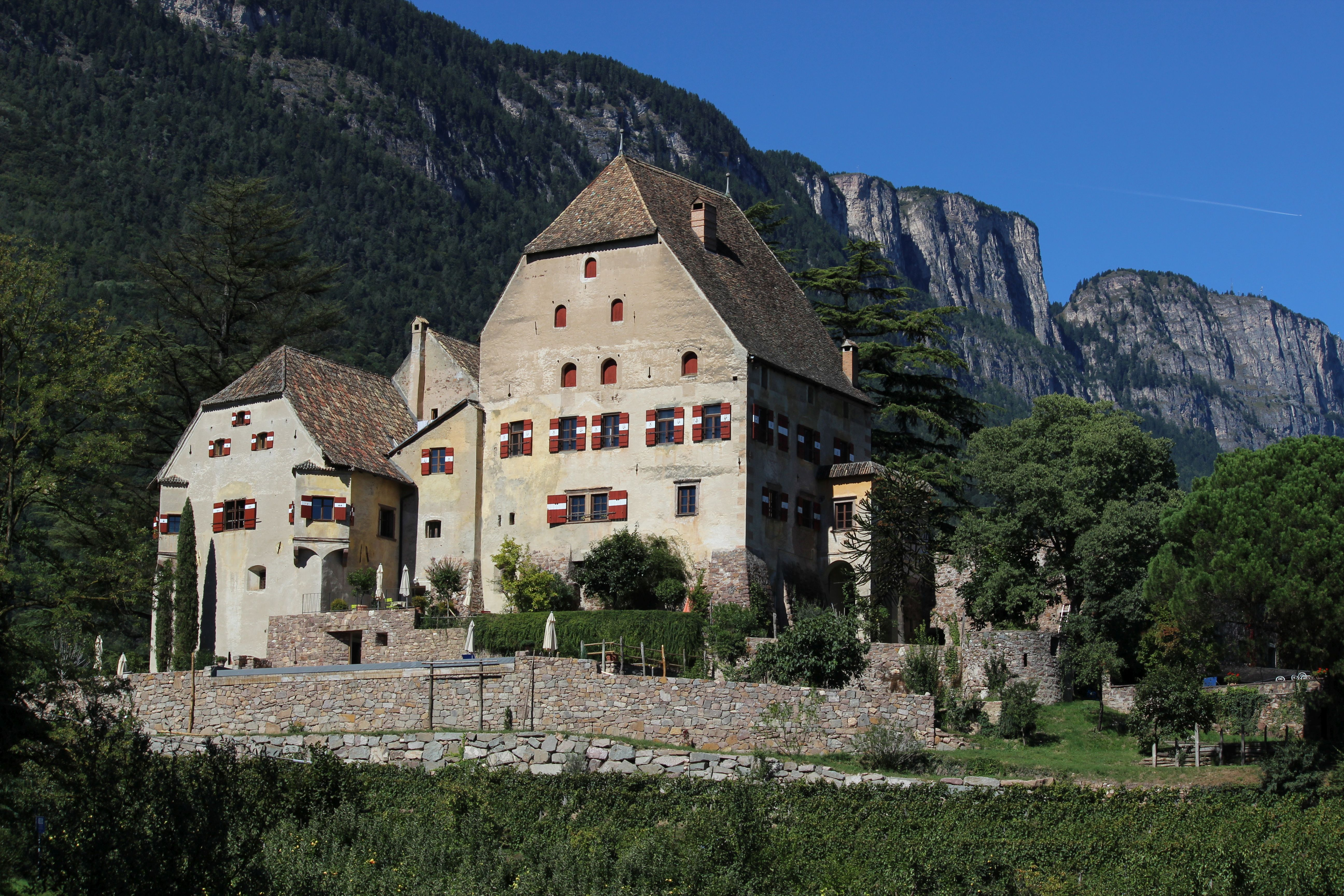
Schloss Englar

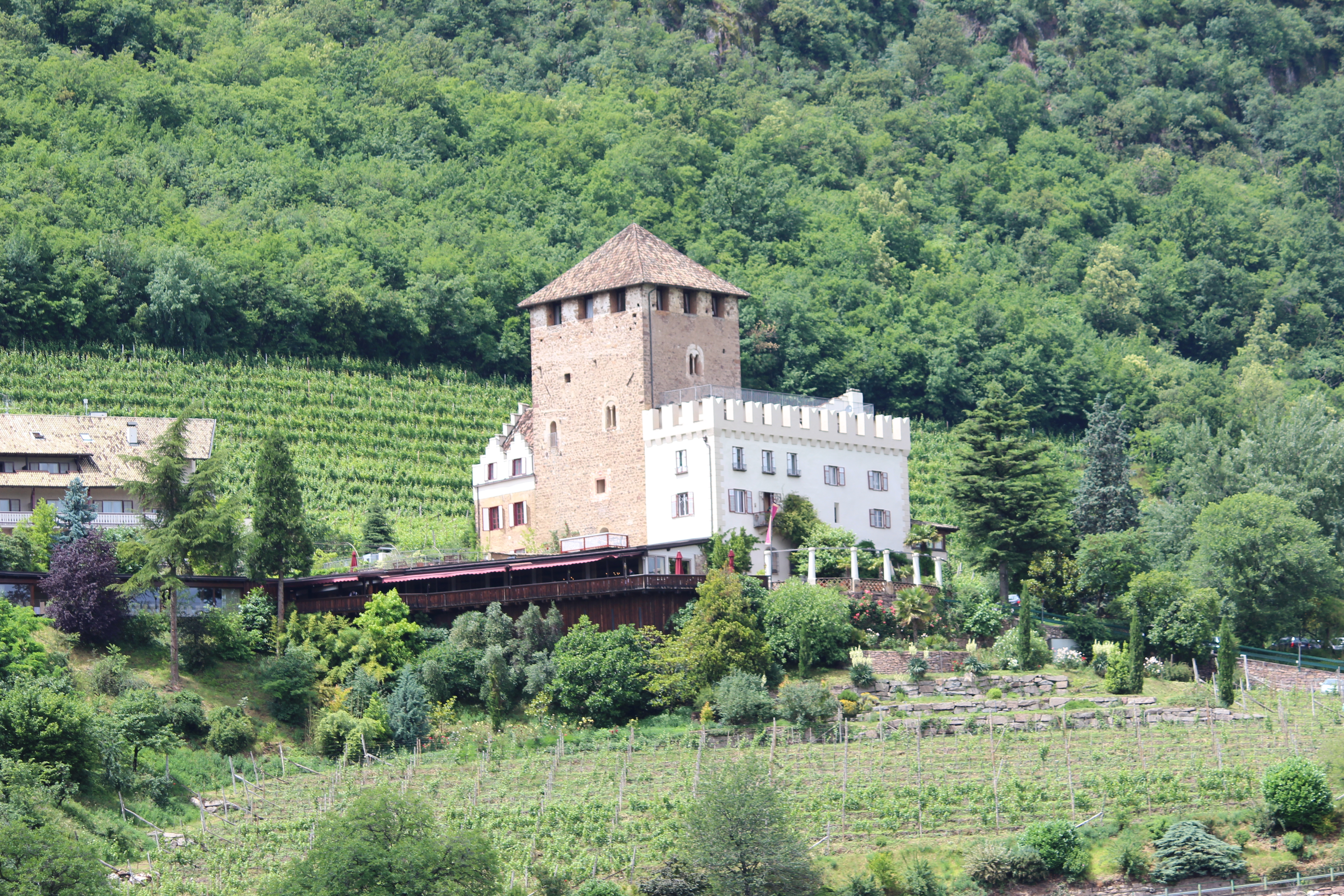
Schloss Korb

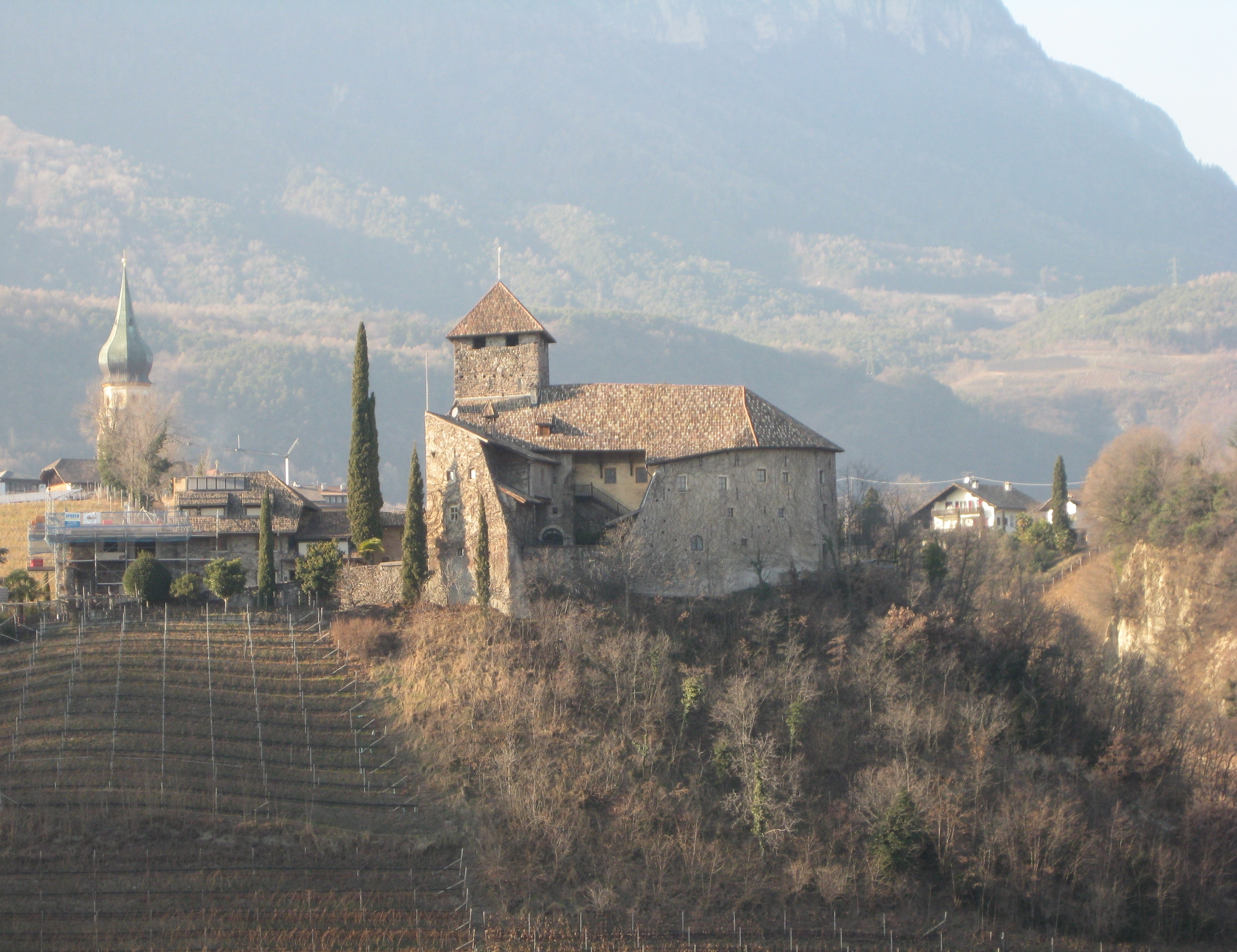
Warth Castle

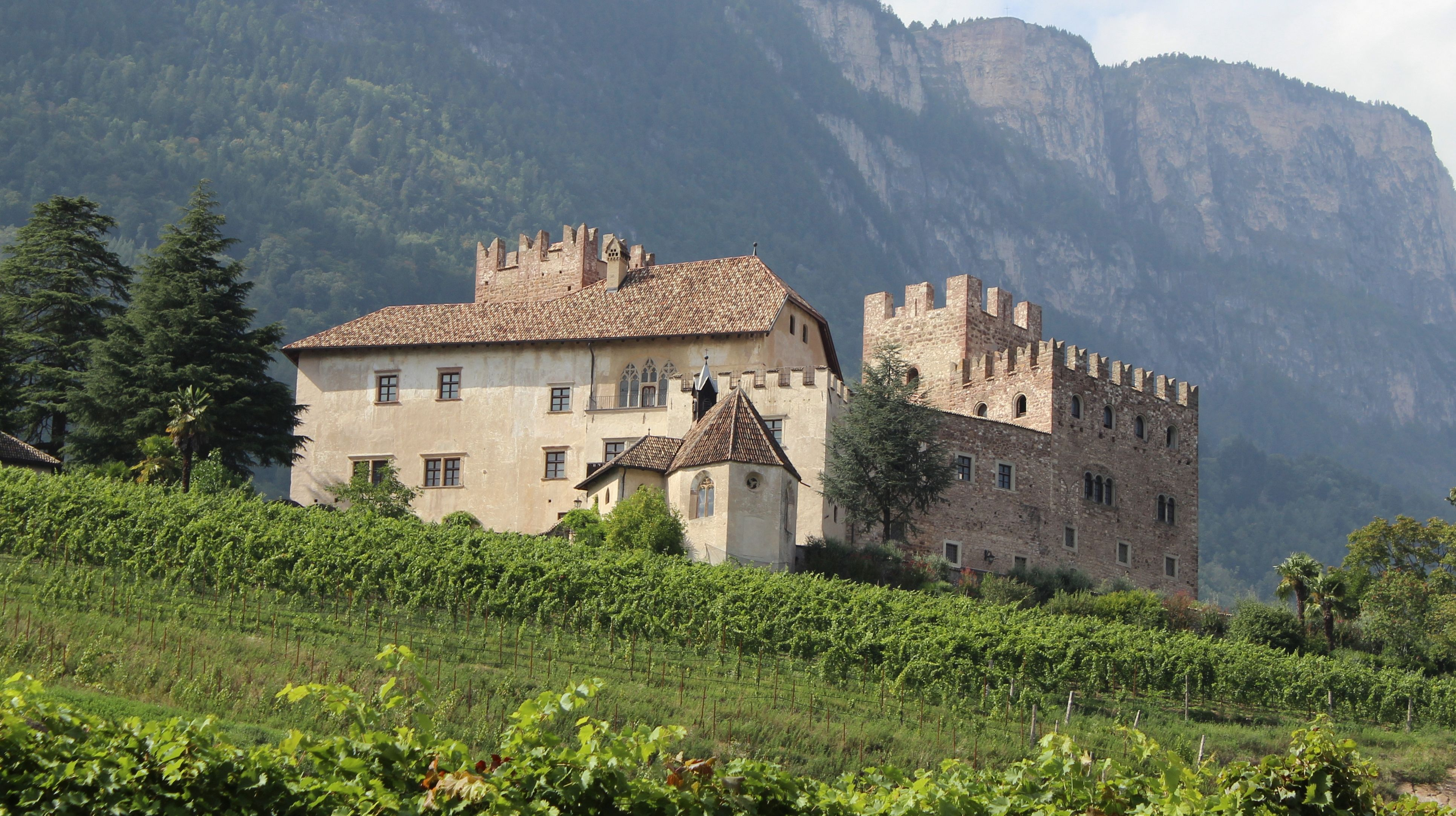
Freudenstein Castle

=== Churches ===
- Parish Church of the Conversion of St. Paul in St. Pauls (also called "Cathedral in the Countryside")
- Dominican Church of St. Joseph in St. Michael
- St. Justina in the hamlet of Berg
- Parish Church of St. Vigilius and Ulrich in Perdonig
- Pilgrimage Church of the Fourteen Holy Helpers in Gaid
- Three Holy Kings in Montiggl
- Gleif Church (Holy Cross Church)
- St. Nicholas in Unterrain
- St. Apollonia in Missian
- Parish Church of St. Martin in Girlan
- Parish Church of St. Joseph in Frangart
- St. Lucy with cemetery in St. Pauls
- Cistercian Mariengarten Abbey
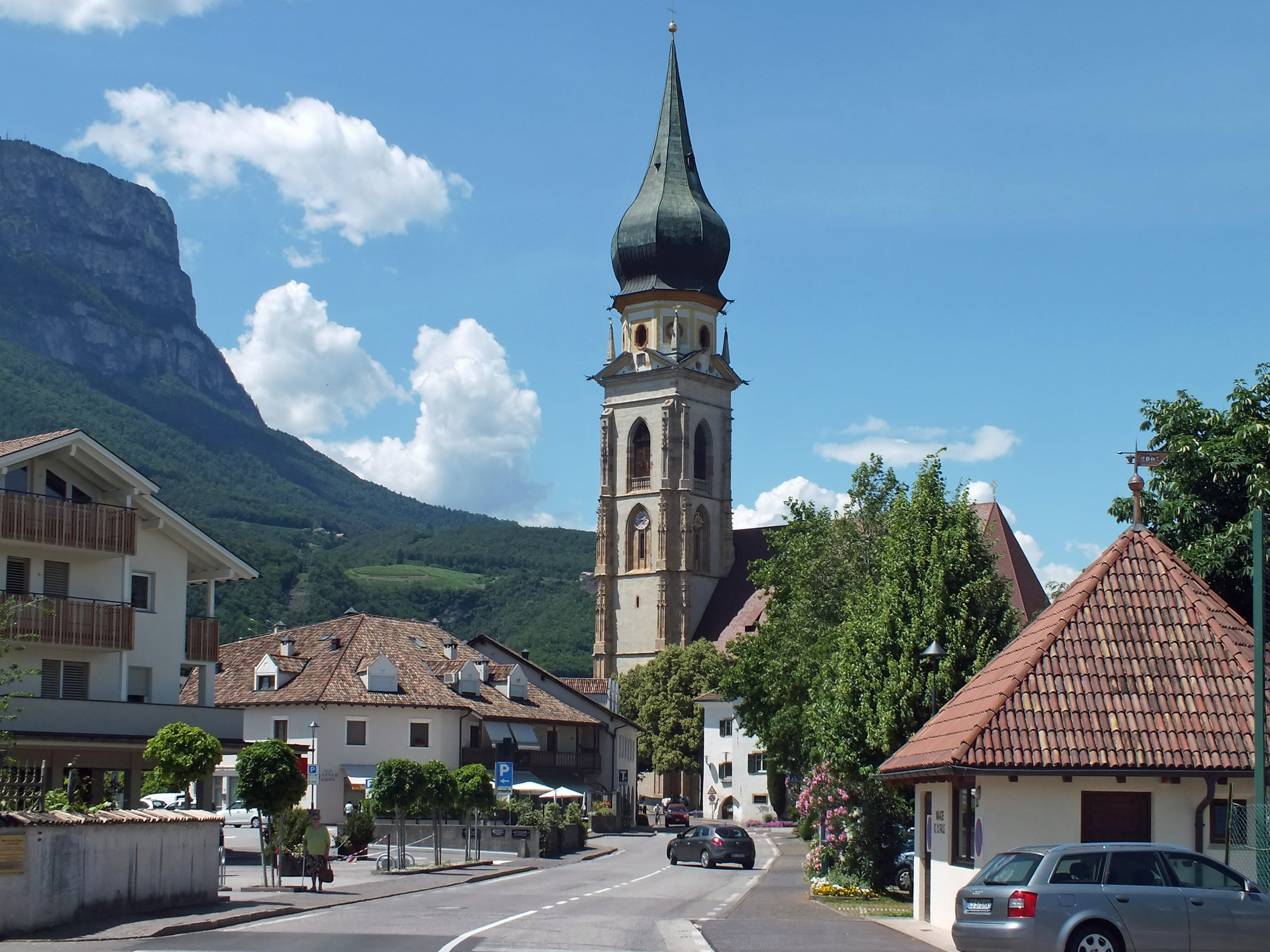
Parish Church in St. Pauls

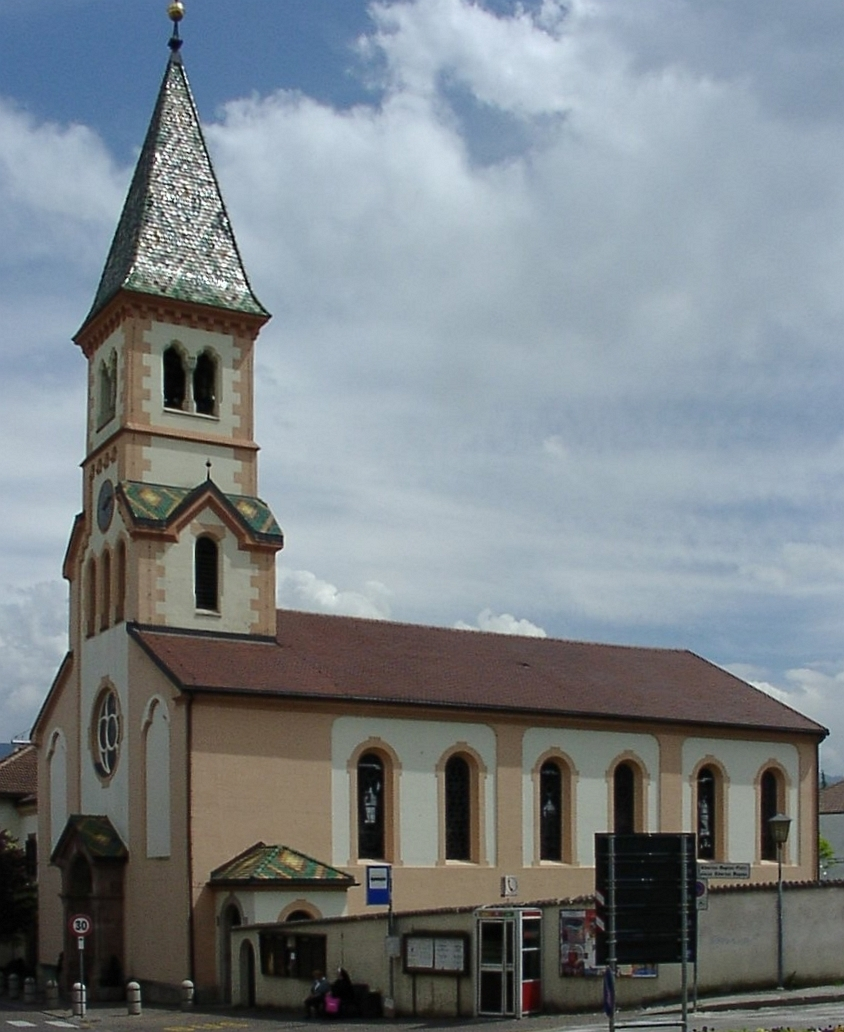
St. Joseph in St. Michael

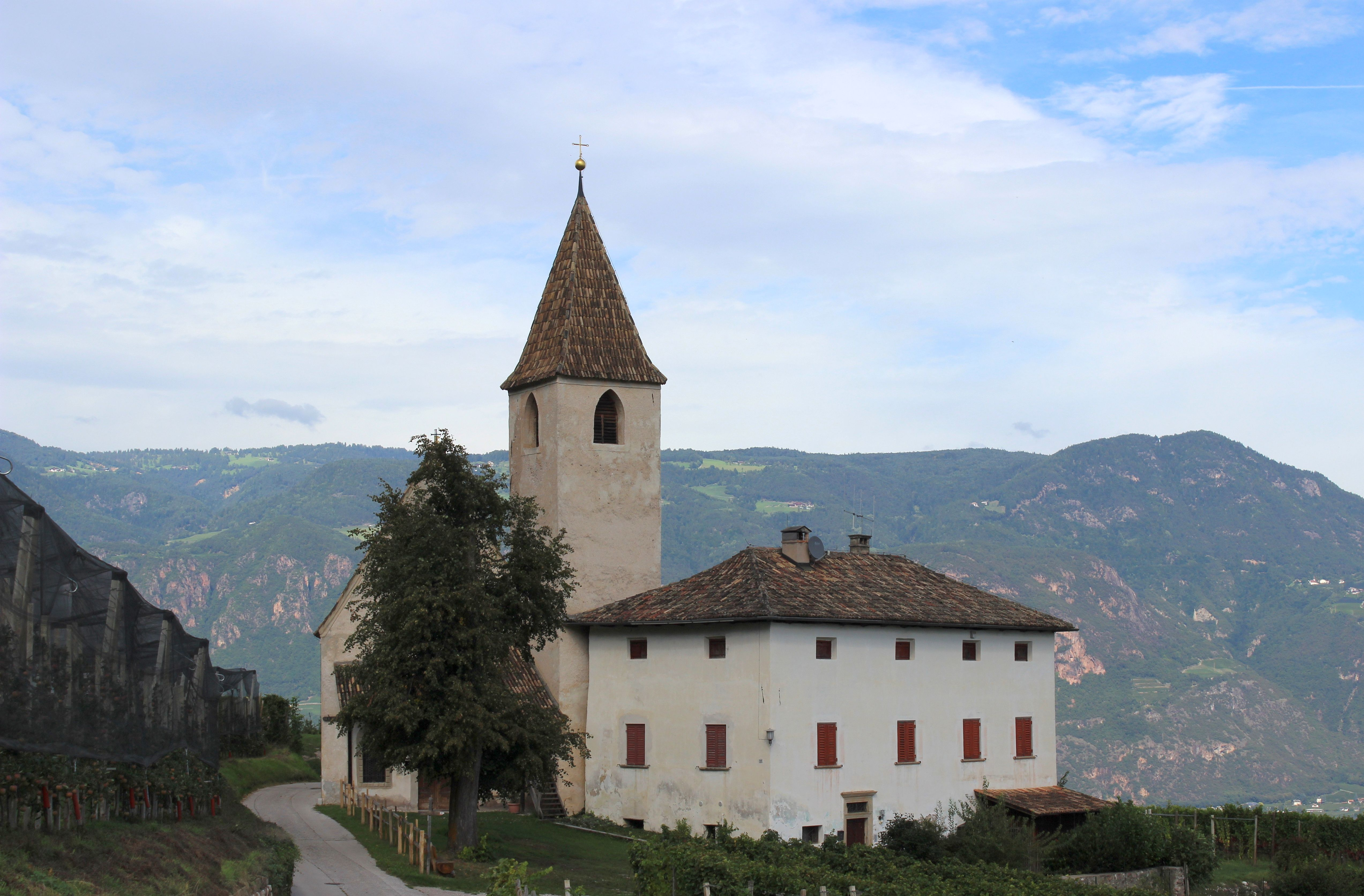
St. Justina in Berg

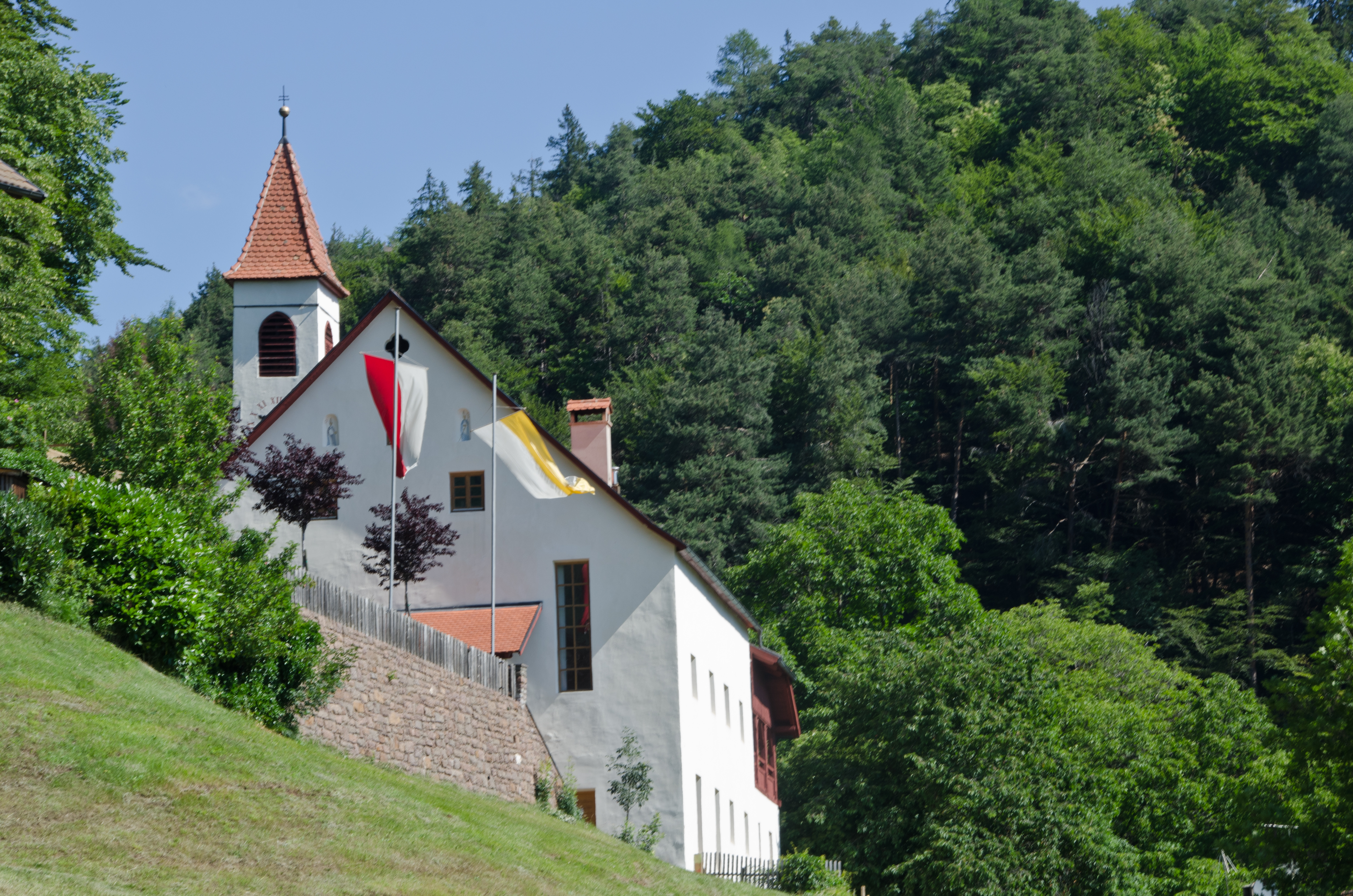
Perdonig Parish Church

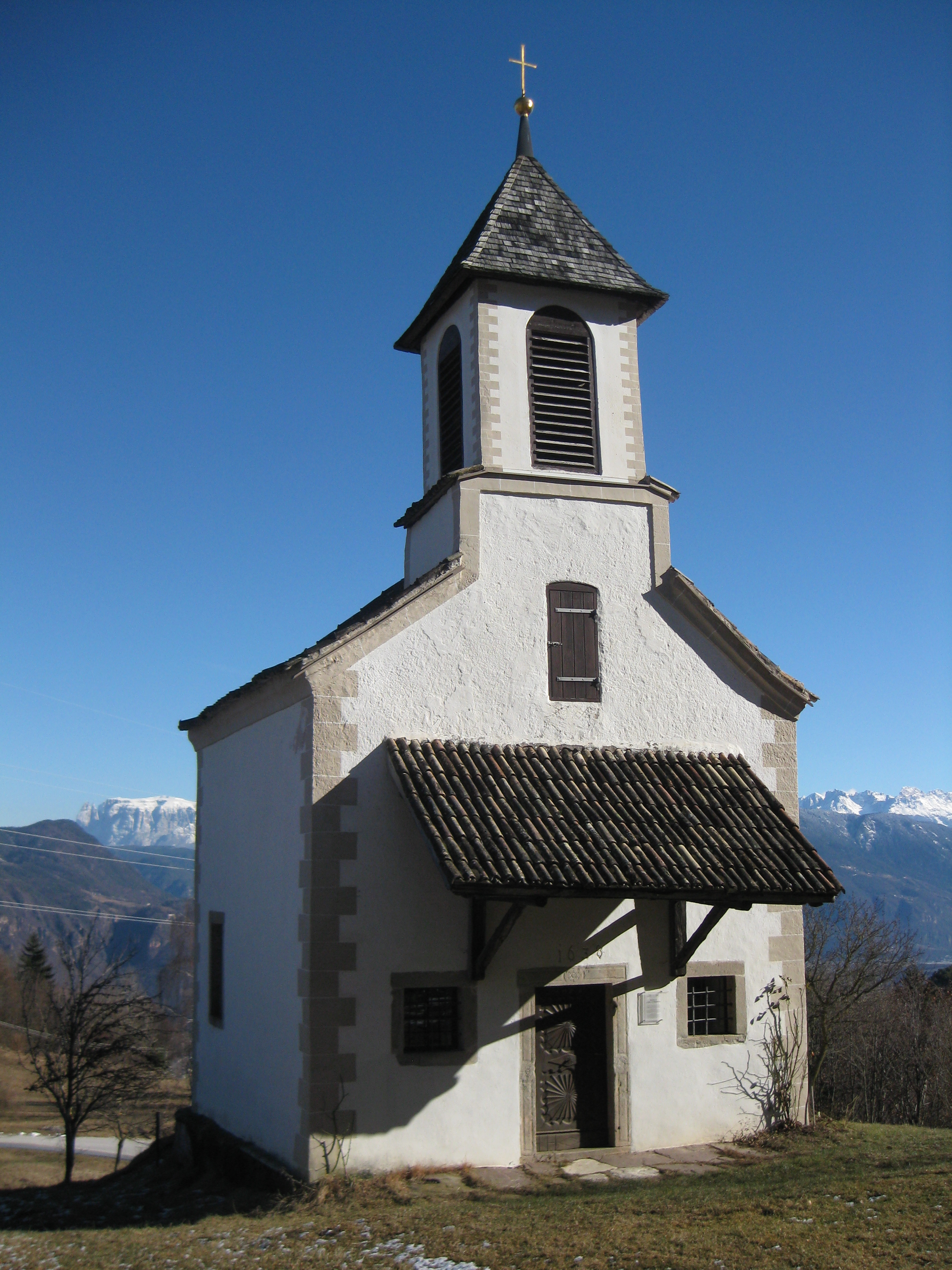
Pilgrimage Church of the Fourteen Holy Helpers in Gaid

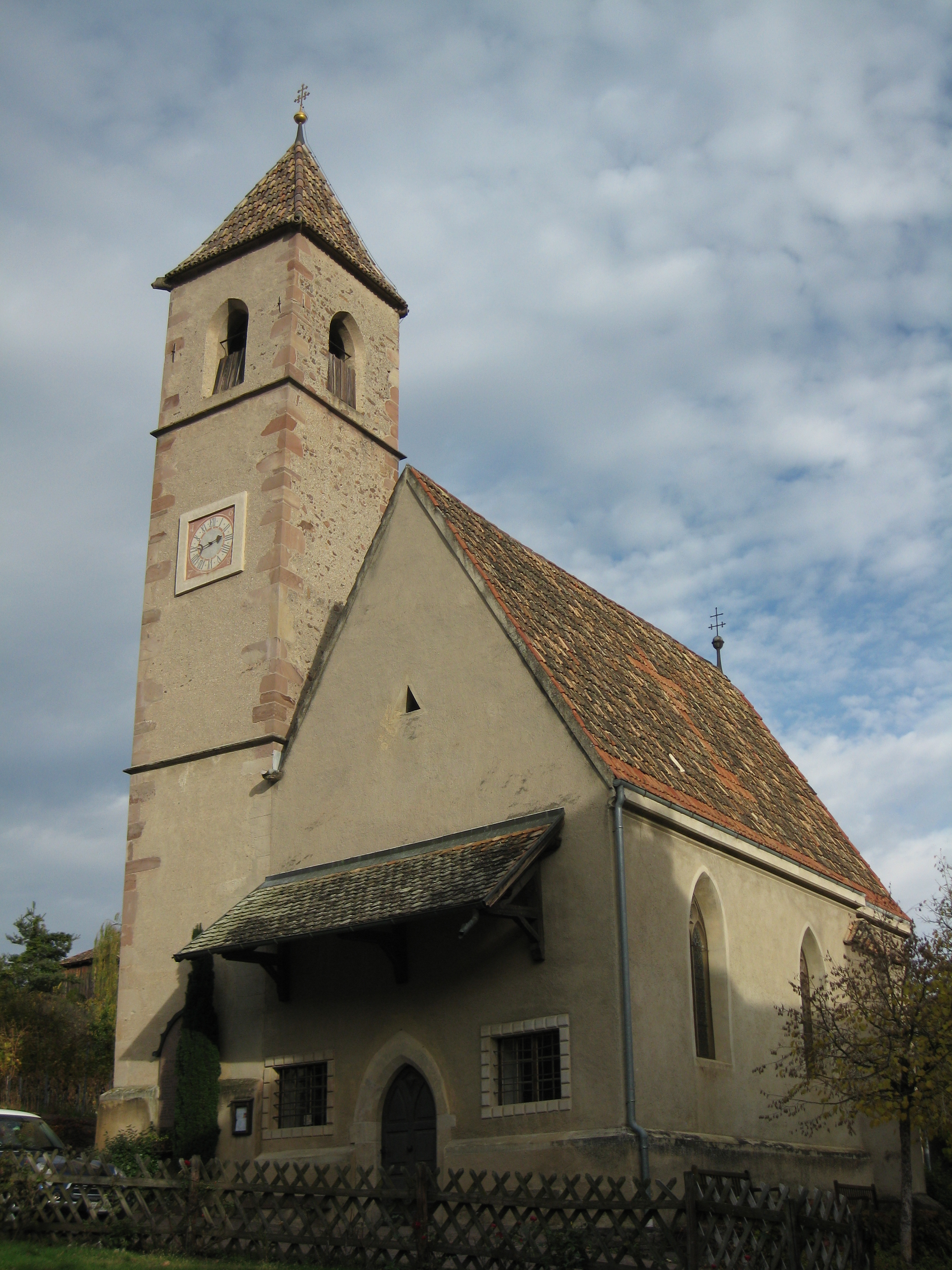
Three Holy Kings in Montiggl

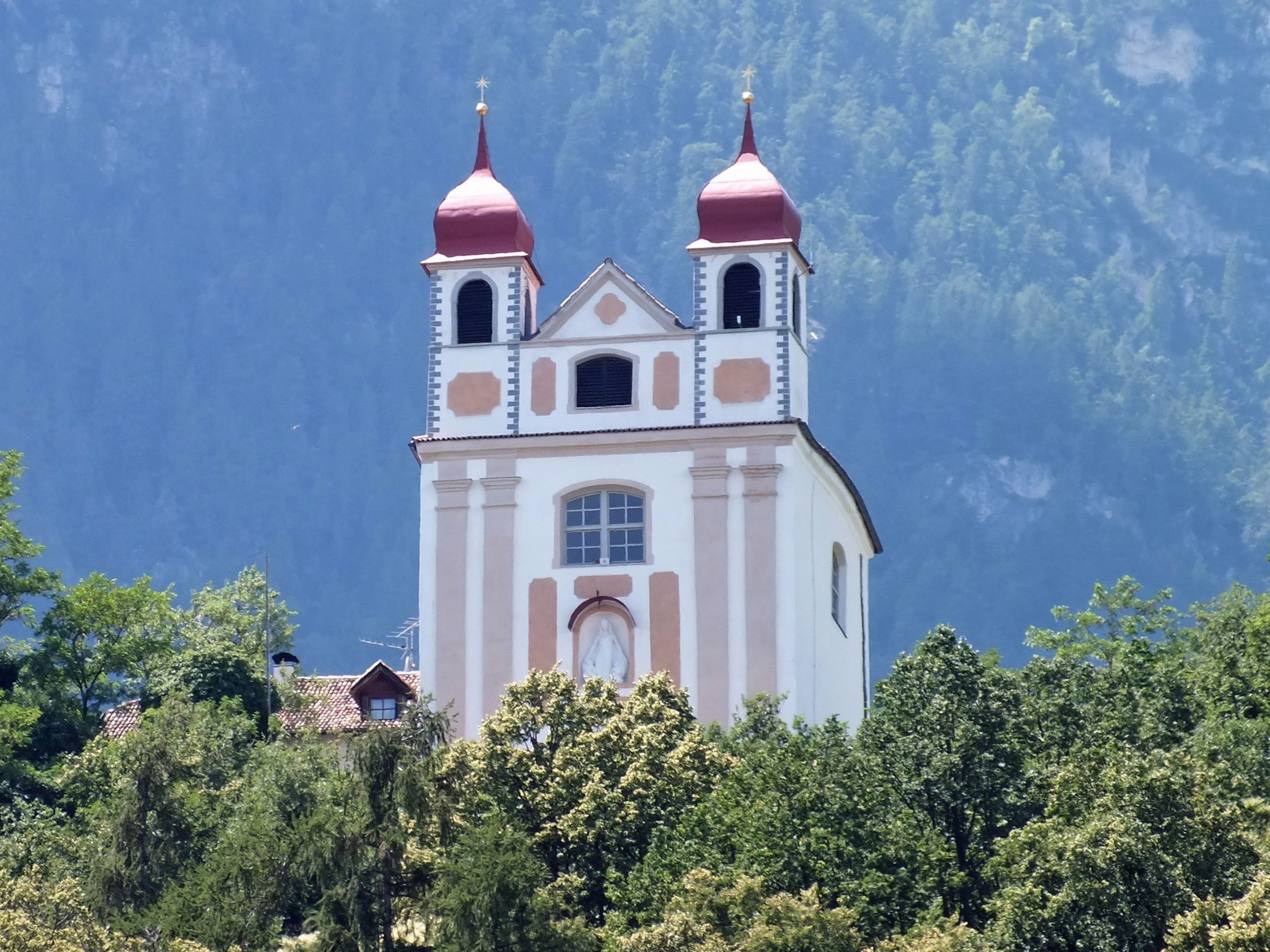
Gleif Church

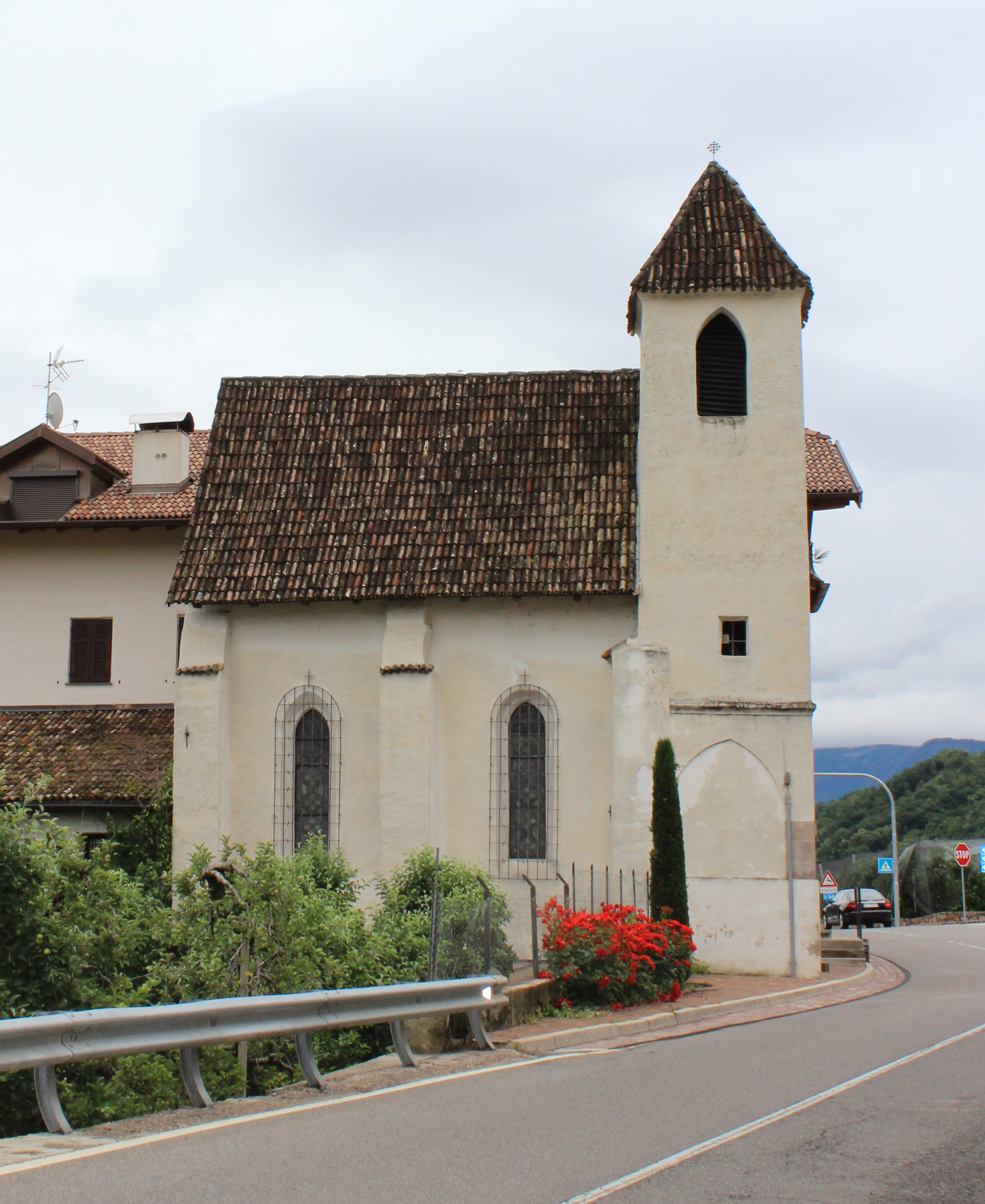
St. Nicholas in Unterrain

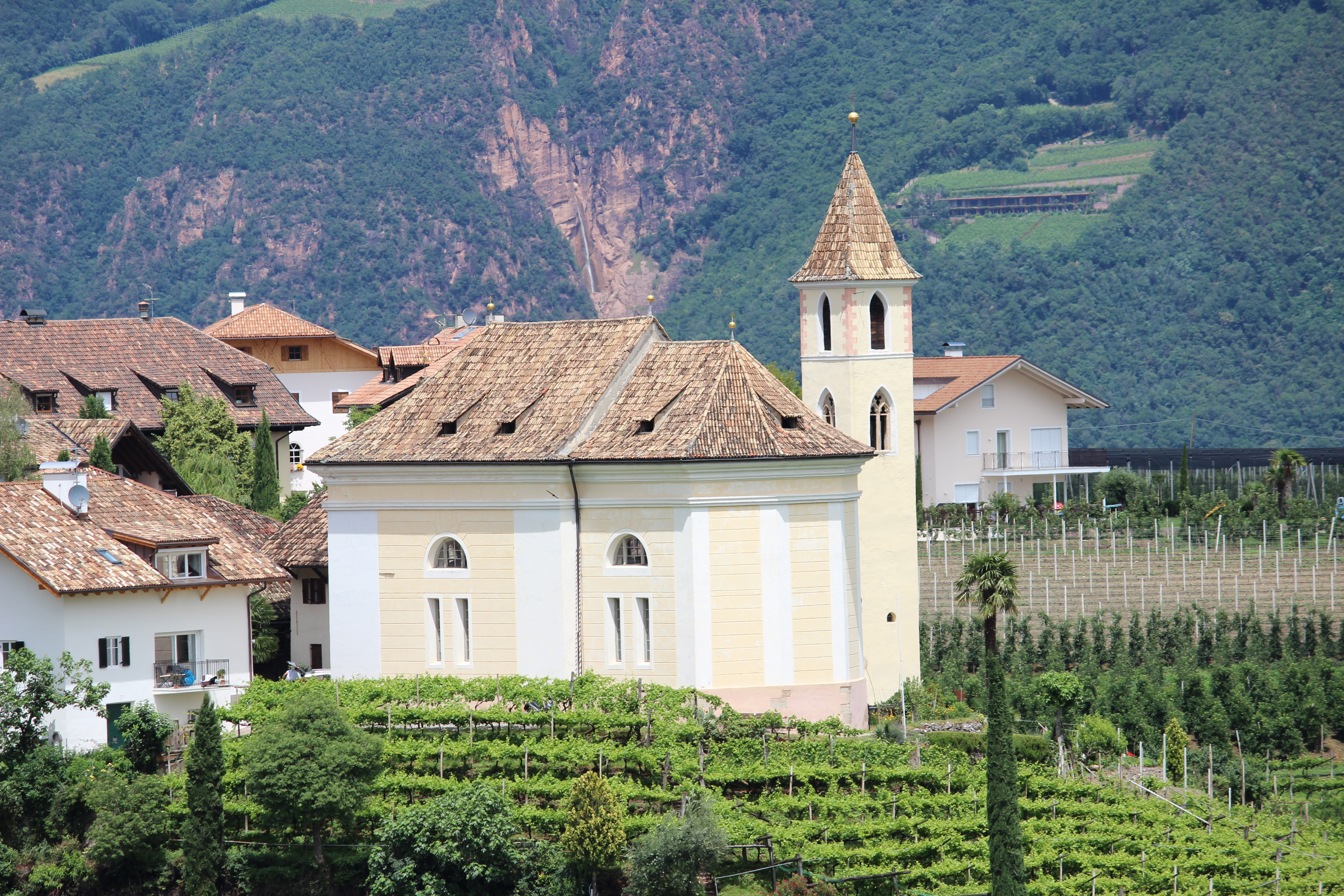
St. Apollonia in Missian

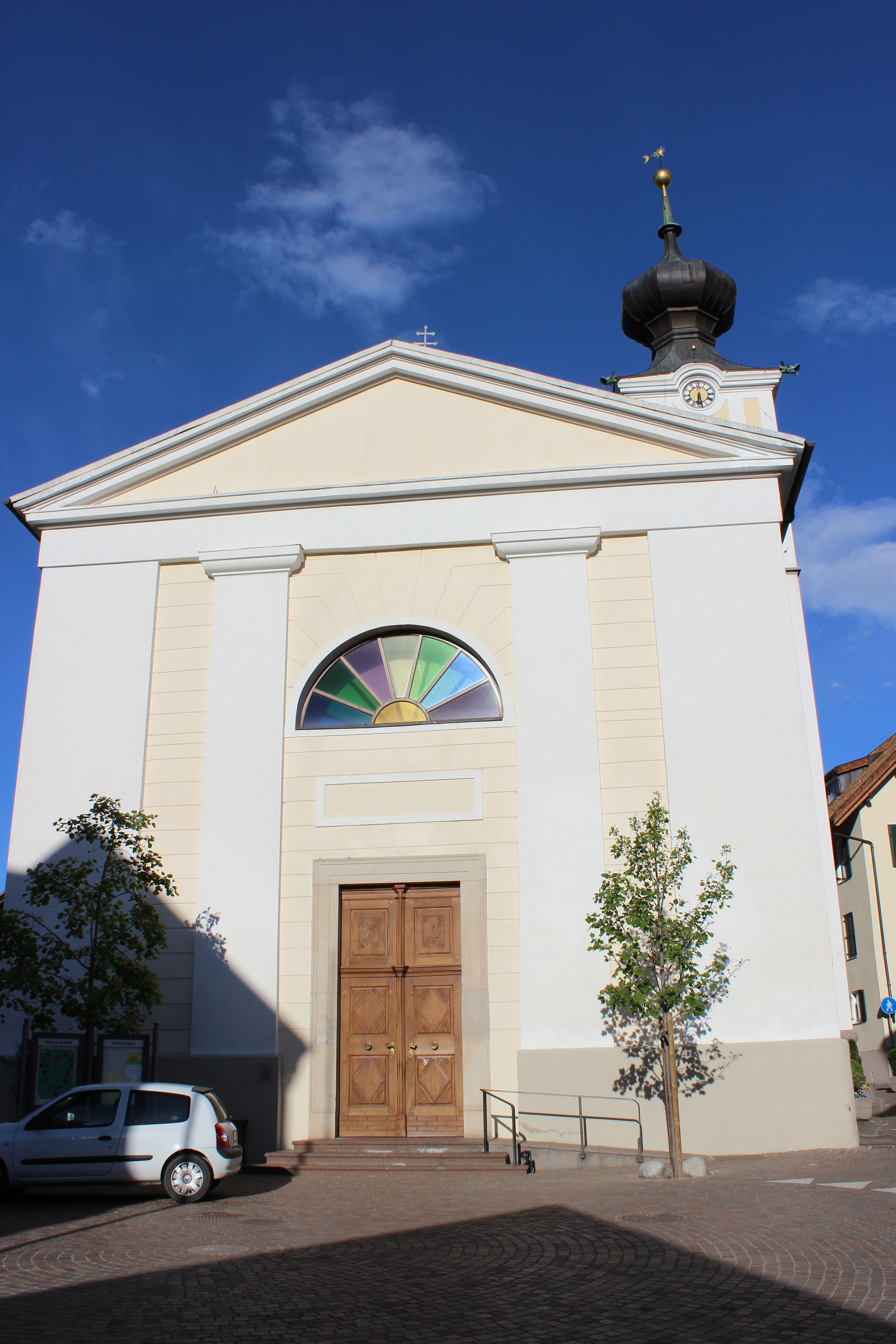
St. Martin in Girlan

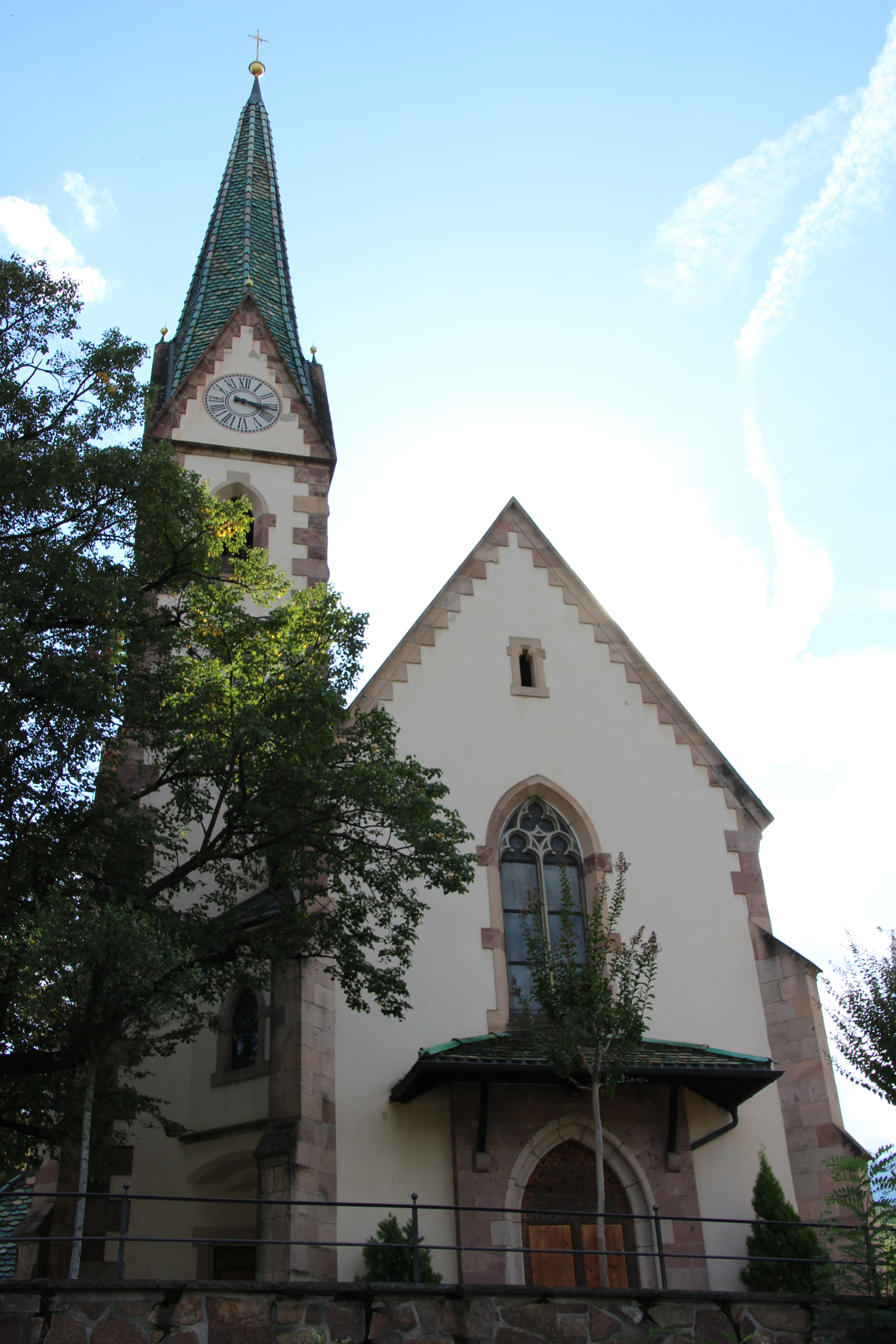
St. Joseph in Frangart

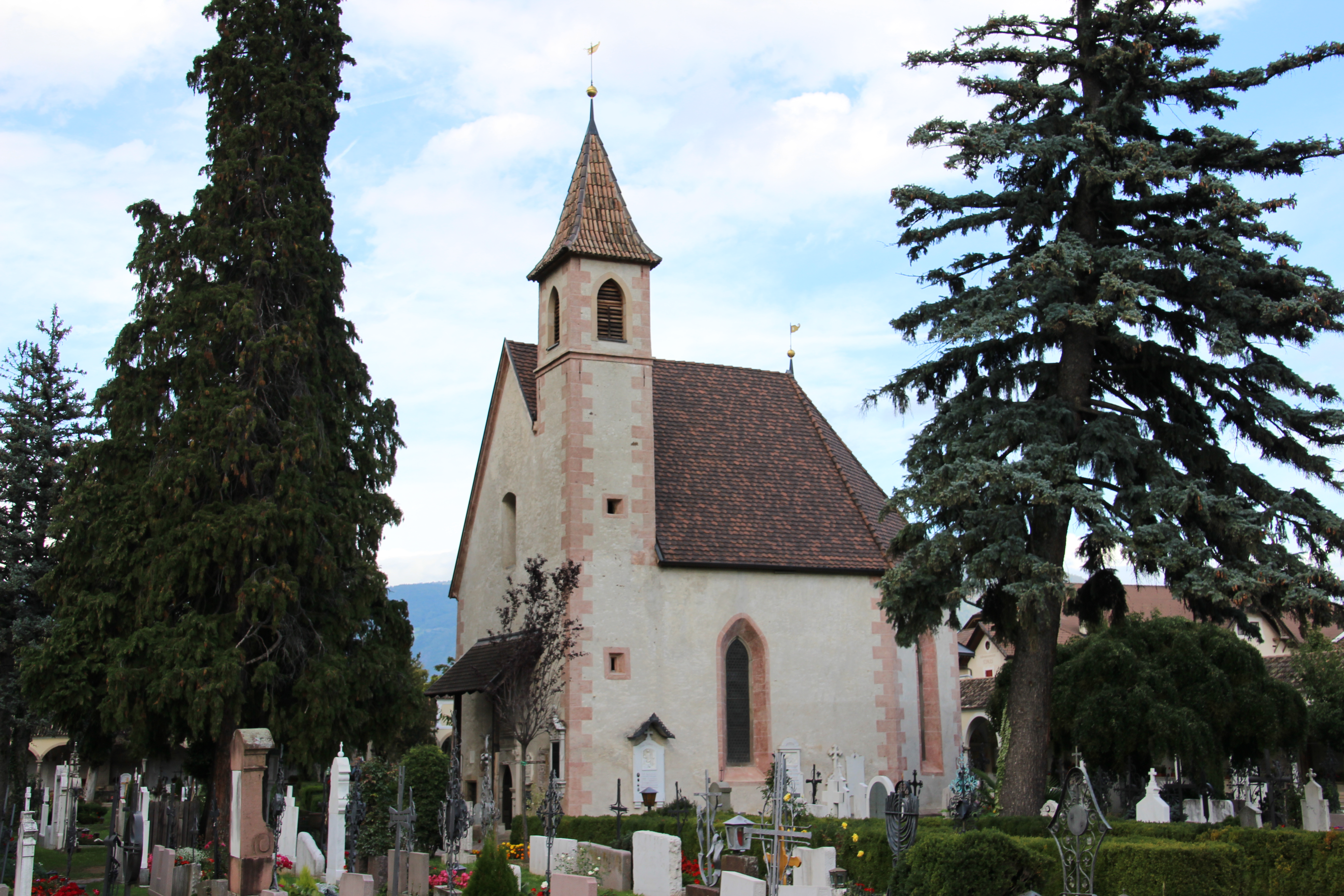
St. Lucy with cemetery

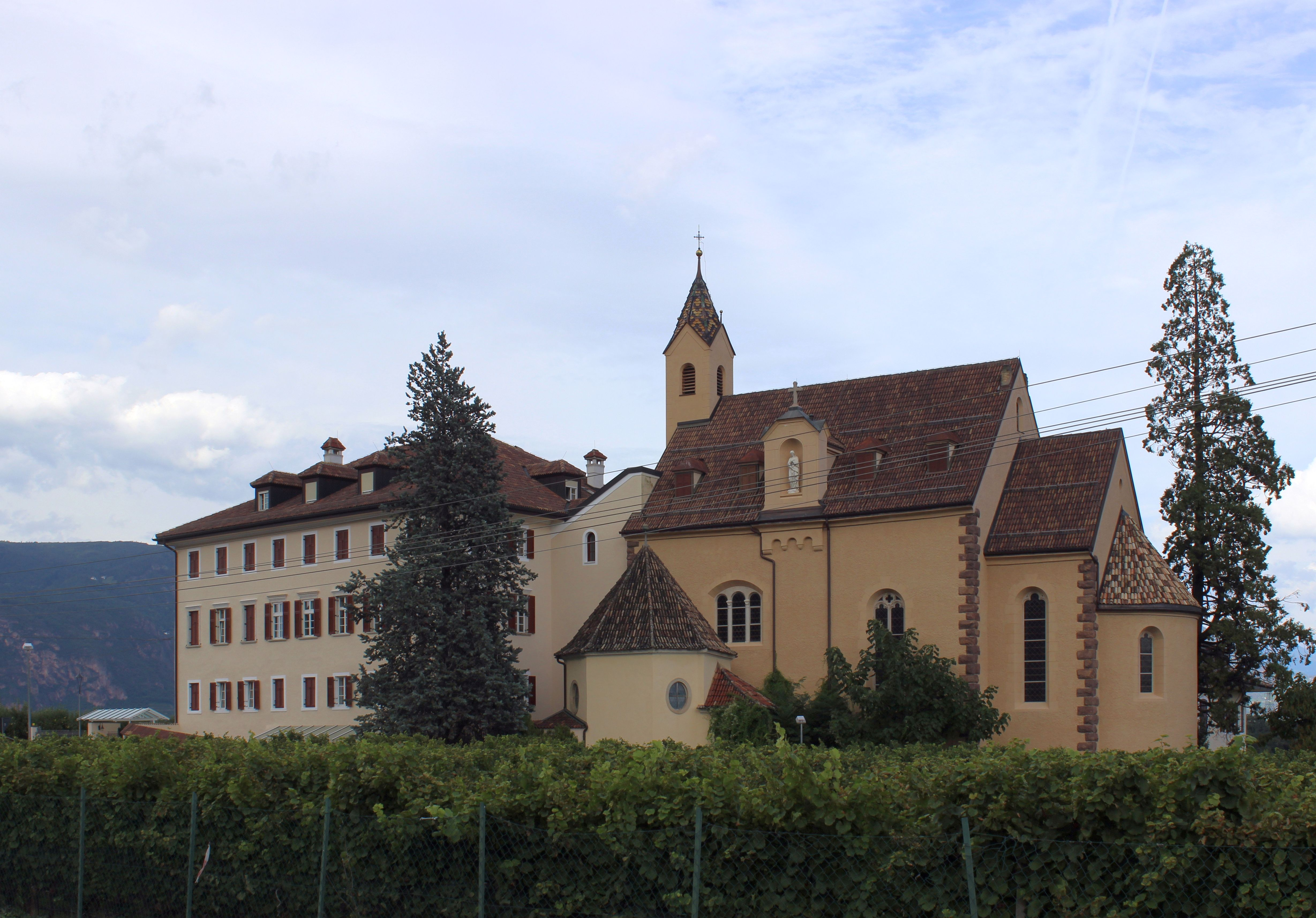
Cistercian Mariengarten Abbey

=== Nature ===
- Large and Small Montiggler See
- The Frühlingstal (Spring Valley) near Montiggl
- The Eppan Ice Holes

== Notable sights ==
- Ansitz Kreit

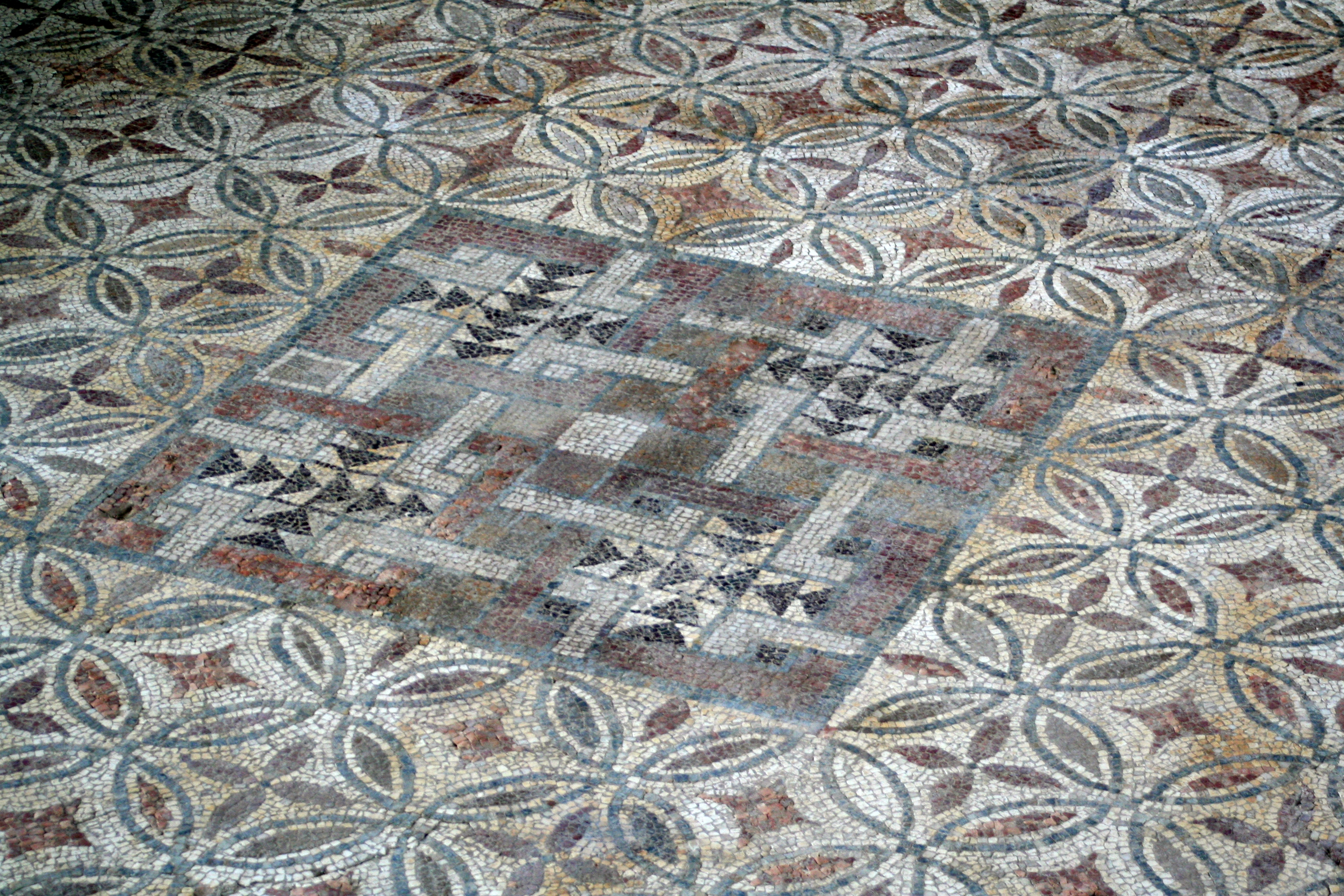
Mosaic in the Roman Villa in St. Pauls

== Society ==
=== Linguistic distribution ===
According to the 2024 census, 84.17% of the population speak German, 15.36% Italian, and 0.47% Ladin as first language.

=== Demographic evolution ===
Historical population

Year	Pop.	±%
1860	?	—
1870	?	—
1880	4,720	—
1900	?	—
1910	6,078	—

Year	Pop.	±%
1921	6,332	+4.2%
1931	6,890	+8.8%
1936	7,061	+2.5%
1951	7,454	+5.6%
1961	7,912	+6.1%

Year	Pop.	±%
1971	9,071	+14.6%
1981	10,112	+11.5%
1991	10,914	+7.9%
2001	12,657	+16.0%

Source: Data from ISTAT

== Infrastructure and transport ==
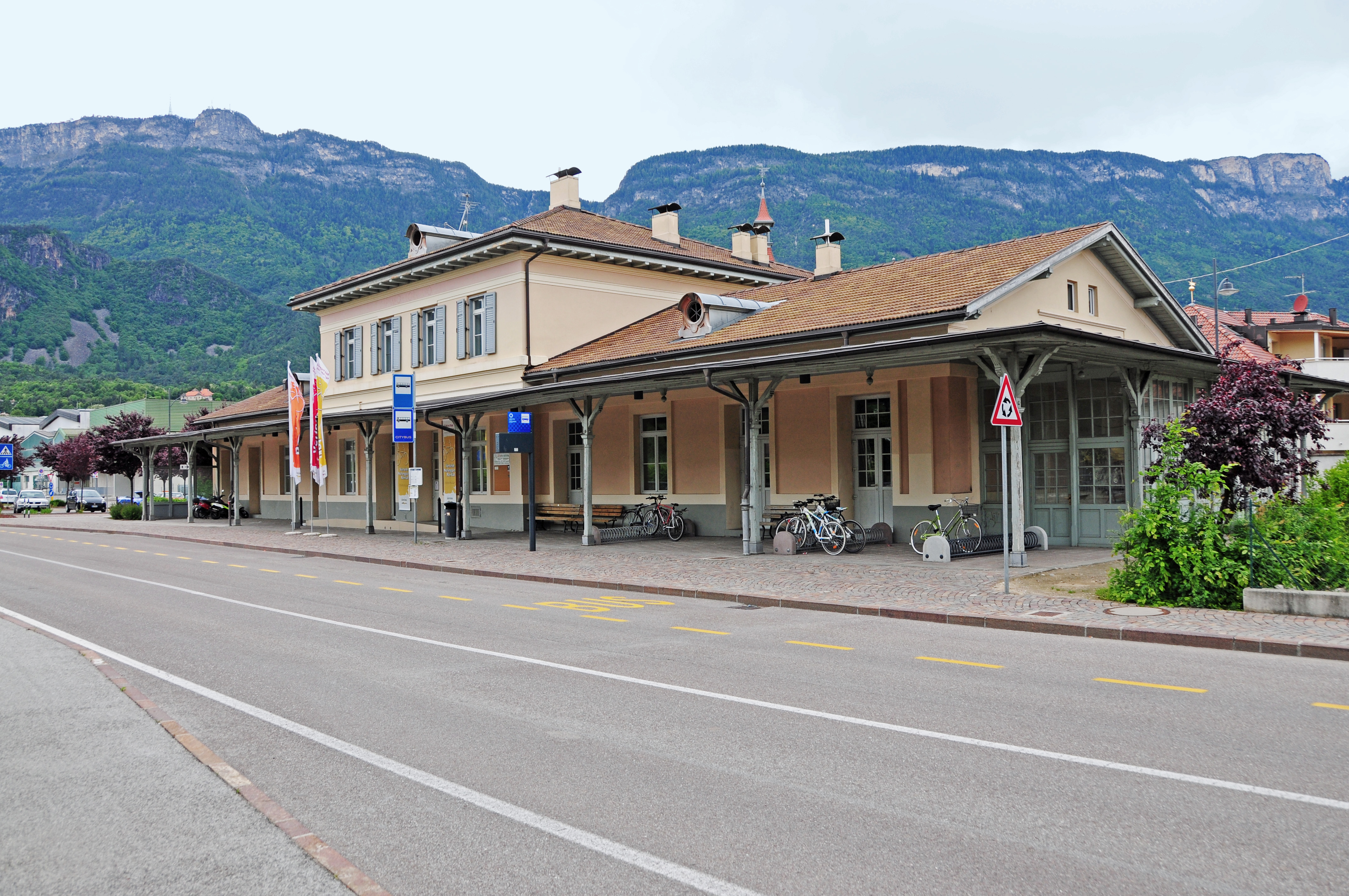
The former Eppan-Girlan railway station on the Bozen–Kaltern railway

The municipality is located along the South Tyrolean Wine Road, a signposted tourist route that promotes the natural, cultural, and environmental heritage of the area, featuring vineyards and estate wineries open to the public. The territory is also crossed by the Überetsch cycle path.

== Education ==
Within the municipality of Eppan, there are five German-language primary schools located in St. Michael, St. Pauls, Missian, Frangart, and Girlan, as well as one middle school in St. Michael. The first three primary schools form a joint school district, while the latter two and the middle school together form a second school district. Additionally, the private middle school "Mariengarten" is located in St. Pauls.

The Italian-language educational offerings are limited to one primary school and one middle school in St. Michael, which are administered by the Europa 1 school district based in Bolzano.

== Sport ==
Among the most important Eppan sports clubs are the football clubs A.F.C. Eppan and A.F.C. St. Pauls, which play in the fifth-highest Italian league (Oberliga/Eccellenza), the ice hockey club HC Eppan Pirates, which uses the Eisstadion Eppan for its home games in the Italian IHL, as well as the SSV Eppan (Elite League handball and skiing).

Additionally, there are several football pitches. One of them, located in the Rungg sports zone, served as a training ground for the German national football team prior to the 1990 World Cup, 2010 World Cup, and 2018 World Cup. The official headquarters of FC Südtirol is also located there.

== Notable people ==
- Egno von Eppan (died 1273), nobleman, prince-bishop of Brixen and Trent
- Johann Georg Platzer (1704–1761), Rococo painter and draughtsman
- Leonhard von Call (1767–1815), composer and virtuoso on the mandolin and guitar
- Sepp Kerschbaumer (1913–1964) South Tyrolean freedom fighter/terrorist, born in Frangart (Frangarto)
- George McAnthony (1966–2011), country singer and songwriter
- Sabina Panzanini (born 1972), former Alpine skier, competed at the 1994 and 1998 Winter Olympics
