= Fondo =

- Comune
- Comune di Fondo
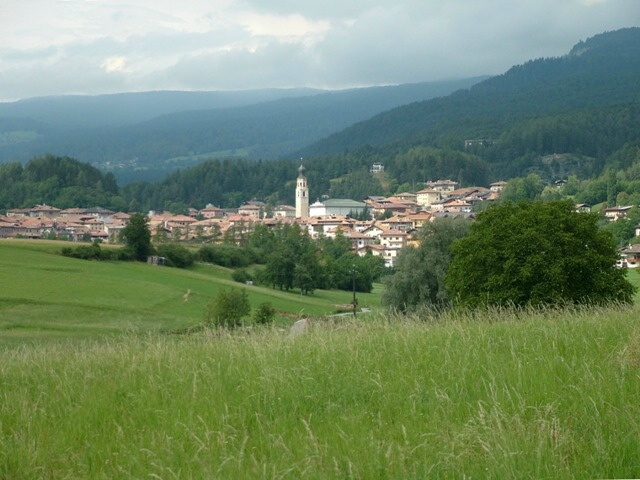

- Location within Italy Location within Trentino-Alto Adige/Südtirol
- Coordinates: 46°26′N 11°8′E
- Country: Italy
- Region: Trentino-Alto Adige/Südtirol
- Province: Trentino (TN)
- Frazioni: Tret, Vasio

Government
  - Mayor: Daniele Graziadei

Area
  - Total: 30.8 km^{2} (11.9 sq mi)
- Elevation: 982 m (3,222 ft)

Population (31 December 2010)
  - Total: 1,475
  - Density: 47.9/km^{2} (124/sq mi)
- Demonym: Fóneri
- Time zone: UTC+1 (CET)
  - Summer (DST): UTC+2 (CEST)
- Postal code: 38013
- Dialing code: 0463
- Patron saint: St. Martin
- Website: Official website

Fondo (Nones: Fón) was a comune (municipality) in Trentino in the northern Italian region Trentino-Alto Adige/Südtirol, located about 40 kilometres (25 mi) north of Trento, precisely at the northern limit of the Val di Non. On 1 January 2020, it was merged with the municipalities of Castelfondo and Malosco to create the comune of Borgo d'Anaunia. Fondo bordered the following municipalities: Brez, Castelfondo, Malosco, Ronzone, Sarnonico, Eppan and Unsere Liebe Frau im Walde-St. Felix.
