= Roen (disambiguation) =

Roen is a mountain of the Nonsberg group.

Roen may also refer to:

== People ==
- Roen (surname)
- Røen, a surname
- Roen Nelson (born 1980), Jamaican footballer
