= Nonsberg Group =

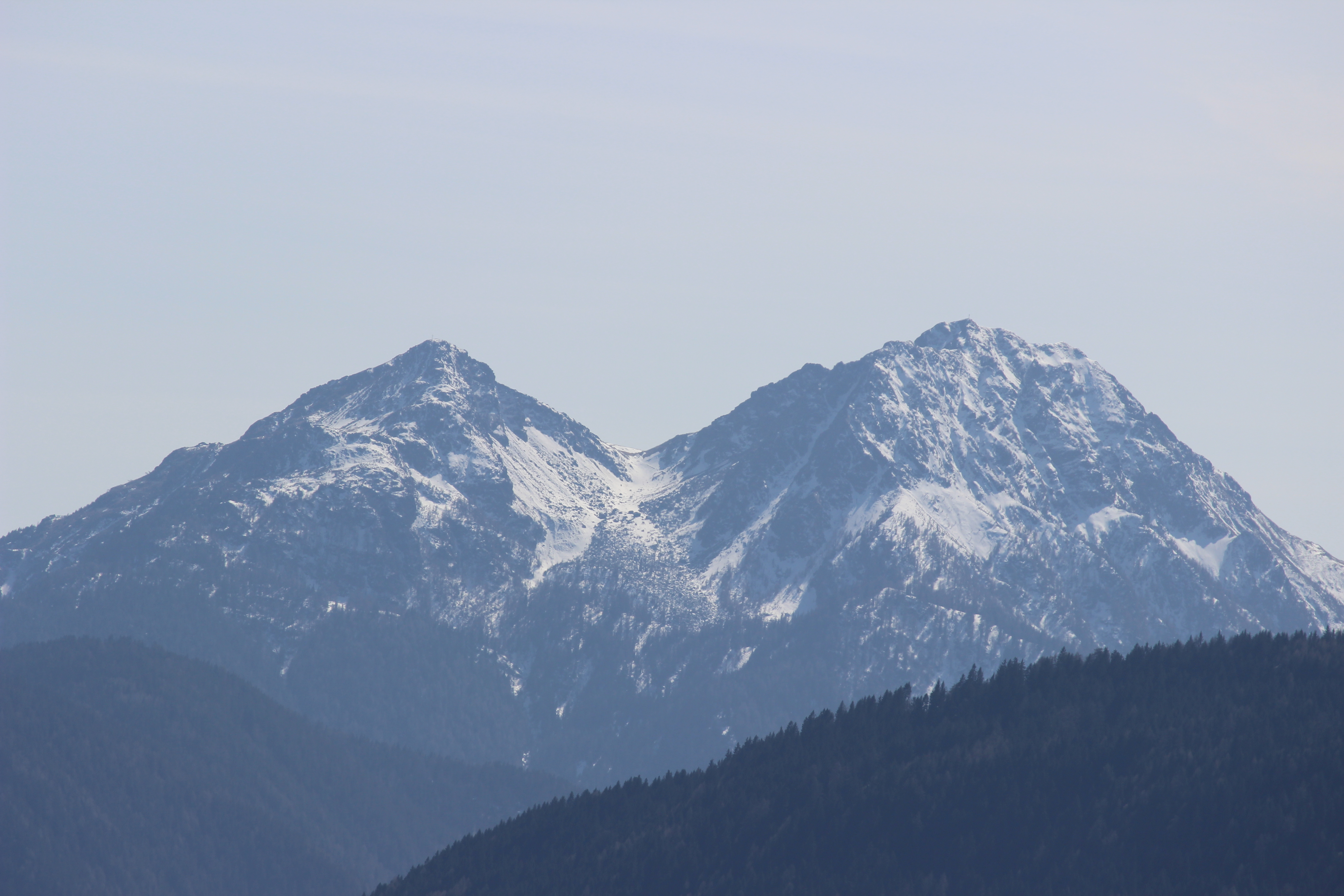
- The twin peaks of the Laugenspitze

Highest point
- Peak: Laugenspitze
- Elevation: 2,434 m s.l.m.

Geography
- Location within Alps
- State(s): South Tyrol and Trentino, Italy
- Range coordinates: 46°32′05″N 11°05′09″E
- Parent range: Eastern Alps

The Nonsberg Group (German: Nonsberggruppe, Italian: Alpi della Val di Non) is a mountain range in South Tyrol and Trentino in Italy and part of the Southern Limestone Alps. A large part of the Nonsberg Group is formed by the Mendelkamm. Their highest peak is the Laugenspitze (2,434 m s.l.m.). The Nonsberg Group is bounded in the east by the Etschtal, to the north by the Prissian High Forest (Ger: Prissianer Hochwald, It: Selva di Prissiano) on the Gampen Pass (It: Passo delle Palade) and in the west by the Non Valley (Ger: Nonstal, It: Val di Non).

== Location ==
The boundary of the range according to the Alpine Club Classification of the Eastern Alps (AVE):

Merano – Etschtal to Mezzocorona − Noce Valley (lower Non Valley/Val di Sole) – Lago di Santa Giustina – Val di Pescara – Proveis − Lederbuch – Hofmahd – Maraunbach to its confluence with the Valschauer Bach – Ultental – Lana – Merano

Until its reclassification in AVE 1984 this group was counted as part of the Brenta Group according to the old 1924 Moriggl Classification (ME).

== Important summits ==
From north to south:

- Laugenspitze (Monte Lucco, 2,434 m s.l.m.)
- Hofbichl (Monte Salomp, 1,818 m s.l.m.)
- Gantkofel (Monte Macaion, 1,866 m s.l.m.)
- Penegal (1,737 m s.l.m.)
- Roen (Monte Roen, 2,116 m s.l.m.)
- Schönleiten (Coste Belle, 1,811 m s.l.m.)
- Tresner Horn (Corno di Tres, 1,817 m s.l.m.)
- Monticello (1,857 m s.l.m.)

== See also ==
- Fondo, Überetsch
