= Thieves of the Wood =

TV historical drama

- De Bende van Jan de Lichte
- Genre: historical drama
- Based on: De bende van Jan de Lichte by Louis Paul Boon
- Screenplay by: Christophe Dirickx; Benjamin Sprengers
- Directed by: Robin Pront; Maarten Moerkerke
- Starring: Matteo Simoni; Stef Aerts
- Country of origin: Belgium
- Original languages: Dutch with some French and German
- No. of seasons: 1
- No. of episodes: 10

Production
- Producer: Dirk Impens
- Editor: Mathieu Depuydt
- Camera setup: Dries Delputte
- Production companies: Menuet; Proximus vtm

Original release
- Network: VTM
- Release: 14 September 2020

Thieves of the Wood is a 10-episode historical drama based on the life of the 18th-century outlaw leader Jan de Lichte, a native of Aalst in what is now Belgium. It became available to English/Spanish-speaking and Spanish-speaking viewers on Netflix in January 2020. It was first made available in Belgium on the Proximus television network and is now being broadcast on the public network by the VTM channel. The original title is De Bende van Jan de Lichte (the gang of Jan de Lichte).

Based on the 1957 novel De bende van Jan de Lichte by Louis Paul Boon, the series presents Jan de Lichte as not merely a highwayman but as a champion of the oppressed lower classes, a kind of Flemish Robin Hood. From 1740 to 1748, during the War of the Austrian Succession, Jan de Lichte operated in the countryside in the vicinity of Aalst.

The series was adapted for television by Christophe Dirickx and Benjamin Sprengers and is directed by Robin Pront and Maarten Moerkerke. Filming took place in the fall of 2016 and the winter and spring of 2017. There was a lot of filming in the Kluisbos forest in Kluisbergen but also a few days in March 2017 at the market in Veurne and in Wulveringem at Beauvoorde Castle. There was also filming on Hasselbroekstraat and Kasteelstraat in Gingelom, in Bokrijk park, at Gravensteen castle, and in the Sahara nature preserve in Lommel.

The series streamed on Netflix international from January 2020 to January 2023.

== Cast ==
- Jan de Lichte, Matteo Simoni
- Tincke, Stef Aerts
- Héloise, Charlotte Timmers
- De Schoen, Anemone Valcke
- Meyvis, Rik Willems
- Magician Vagenende, Iwein Segers
- Bailiff Baru, Tom Van Dyck
- Nicolaï Van Gelderhode, Rik Verheye
- Judoca, Ruth Beeckmans
- Goorissen, Mathijs Scheepers
- Urkens, Michael Vergauwen
- Anne-Marie, Anne-Laure Vandeputte
- Marieke, Sofie De Brée
- De Schele, Jeroen Perceval
- Magda de Wispelaeren, Inge Paulussen
- Sproetje, Manou Kersting
- Minna, Greet Verstraete
- Michel Embo, Peter De Graef
- De Spanjol, Tibo Vandenborre
- Notary Woeste, Ludo Hoogmartens
- Poelier, Tom Vermeir
- Le Houcke, Arnaud Lorent
