= Munkzwalm =

- Village
- Interactive map of Munkzwalm
- Coordinates: 50°53′N 3°41′E
- Country: Belgium
- Region: Flanders
- Province: East Flanders
- Municipality: Zwalm

Area
  - Total: 4.99 km^{2} (1.93 sq mi)

Population (2001)
  - Total: 1,940
  - Density: 389/km^{2} (1,010/sq mi)
- Postal code: 9630

Munkzwalm is a village in the Flemish Region of Belgium, located in the province of East Flanders. It is a submunicipality of Zwalm and serves as its main administrative centre.

== History ==
The oldest known mention of Munkzwalm dates from the 10th century as Sualma. The name later evolved into Munkzwalm, referring to the Zwalm river and the addition of "munk", indicating the influence of the monks of the Saint Bavo's Abbey in Ghent, who played a significant role in the development of the settlement. From the domain group of Wormene, a new independent domain centre known as villa Suualma emerged by 1003 at the latest.

The earliest settlement was located near the village green at Ten Bergen, northeast of the current village centre and north of the Zwalm. A chapel existed there before 1003. The lower meadows south of the river remained largely uncultivated until the 12th or 13th century, when they were parcelled out by the abbey, leading to the development of the present village centre. The establishment of the parish church likely occurred after 1003, when the settlement became an independent domain centre.

In the Middle Ages, Munkzwalm fell under the direct jurisdiction of the counts of Flanders and the castellany of the Land of Aalst. Important estates such as the "Hof ter Biest" and "Hof te Zwalmen" belonged to Saint Bavo's Abbey. The abbey, and later the Chapter of Saint Bavo in Ghent, also held the patronage rights of the parish church.

== Geography ==
Munkzwalm covers an area of approximately 499 hectares and is situated in sandy-loam Flanders along the Zwalm river. The landscape is strongly undulating, forming part of the interfluve between the Upper Scheldt and the Dender, with elevations ranging from about 17 metres in the Zwalm valley to 60 metres on the southern slopes. The soils are generally fertile and well-drained, with wetter conditions in the numerous stream depressions.

The village borders Beerlegem, Dikkele, and Hundelgem to the north, Zottegem (Velzeke) to the east, Roborst and Sint-Denijs-Boekel to the south, and Sint-Maria-Latem and Paulatem to the west. It is crossed by major routes including the road from Hundelgem to Brakel and the railway line between Kortrijk and Brussels, constructed in 1868.

At the hamlet of Rekegem, two important Gallo-Roman roads once intersected: the route from Bavay to Velzeke and the road from Asse to Kortrijk.

== Landmarks ==
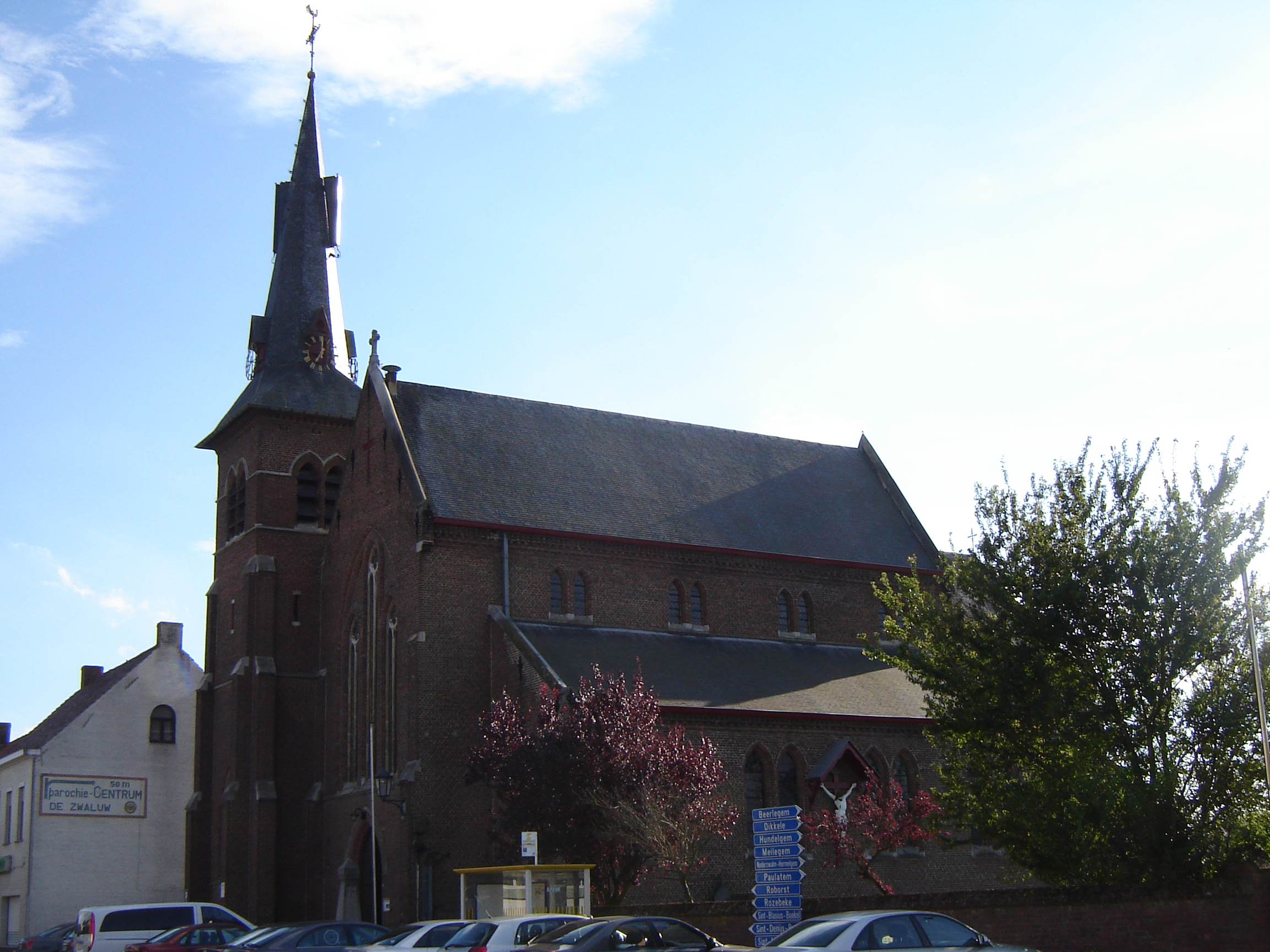
Church of Munkzwalm (2007)

The village centre is located between the railway line and the Zwalm river, with a station building dating from the construction of the railway in 1868. The surrounding Zwalm valley is known for its scenic landscape and historic mills, including the Zwalmmolen, which contribute to local tourism.

Historic farmsteads such as Hof ter Biest and Hof te Zwalmen reflect the agricultural heritage of the area and its historical ties to Saint Bavo's Abbey.

== Economy and infrastructure ==
Munkzwalm has traditionally been an agricultural community but also functions as a residential area with commuter connections, particularly to Brussels. The presence of the railway line and road infrastructure has supported its role as the central village of the Zwalm municipality. Tourism, especially day trips to the Zwalm valley, also plays a role in the local economy.
