= Roen (surname) =

Roen is a surname. Notable people with the surname include:

- Allard Roen (1921–2008), American businessman
- Clara 't Roen (died 1524), Flemish Lutheran
- Katrina Roen, New Zealand psychologist and sociologist

== See also ==
- Roeg
- Røen
