= Laugenspitze =

Mountain in Italy

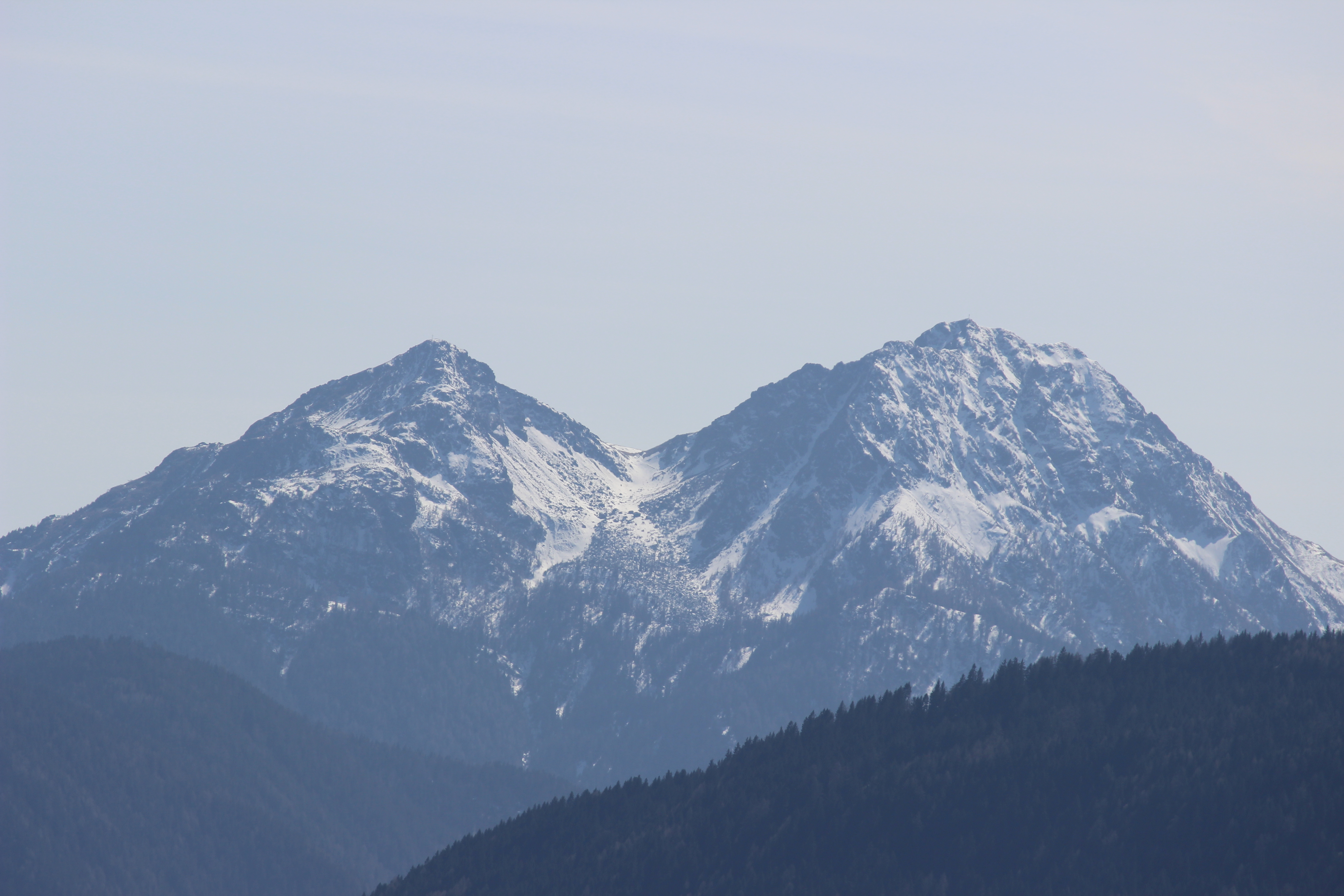
- The two peaks of the mountain as seen from northwest

Highest point
- Elevation: 2,434 m (7,986 ft)
- Prominence: 653 m ↓ Hofmahdjoch
- Coordinates: 46°32′05″N 11°05′09″E

Geography
- Location within Alps
- Location: South Tyrol, Italy
- Parent range: Ortler Alps

The Laugenspitze (German: Laugenspitze; Italian: Monte Luco [ˈmonte ˈluːko]) is a mountain in the Ortler Alps in South Tyrol, Italy.
