= Roeg =

Roeg is a surname. Notable people with this surname include:

- Johnny Roeg (1910–2003), Dutch footballer
- Nicolas Roeg (1928–2018), English director

== See also ==
- Roen (surname)
