= Penegal =

Mountain in Italy

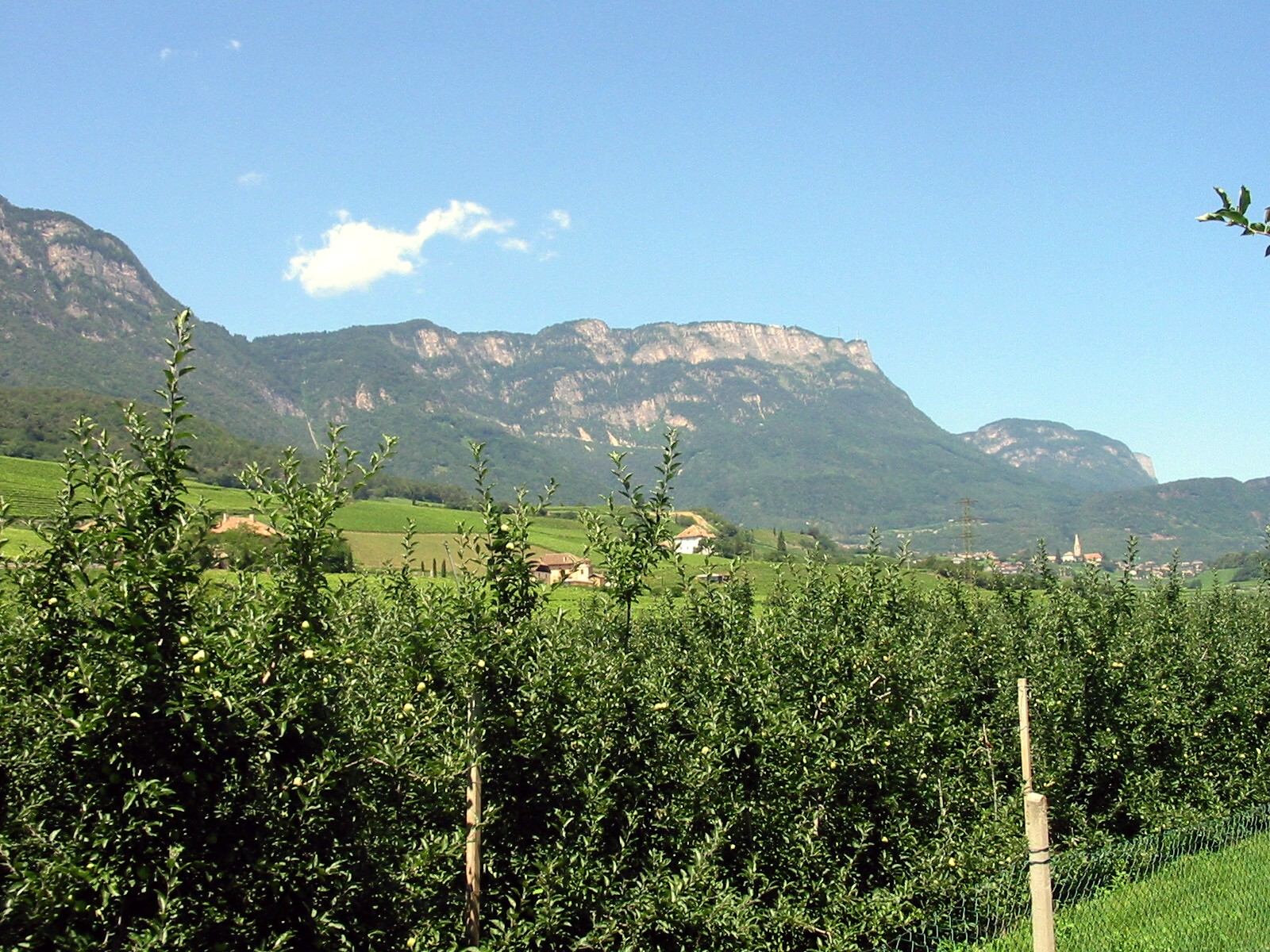

Highest point
- Elevation: 1,737 m (5,699 ft)
- Coordinates: 46°26′18.75″N 11°13′0.13″E

Geography
- Location: South Tyrol, Italy
- Parent range: Nonsberg group

The Penegal is a mountain of the Nonsberg group near Kaltern, South Tyrol, Italy.
