= Zwalm =

Municipality in the Belgian province of East Flanders

- Municipality
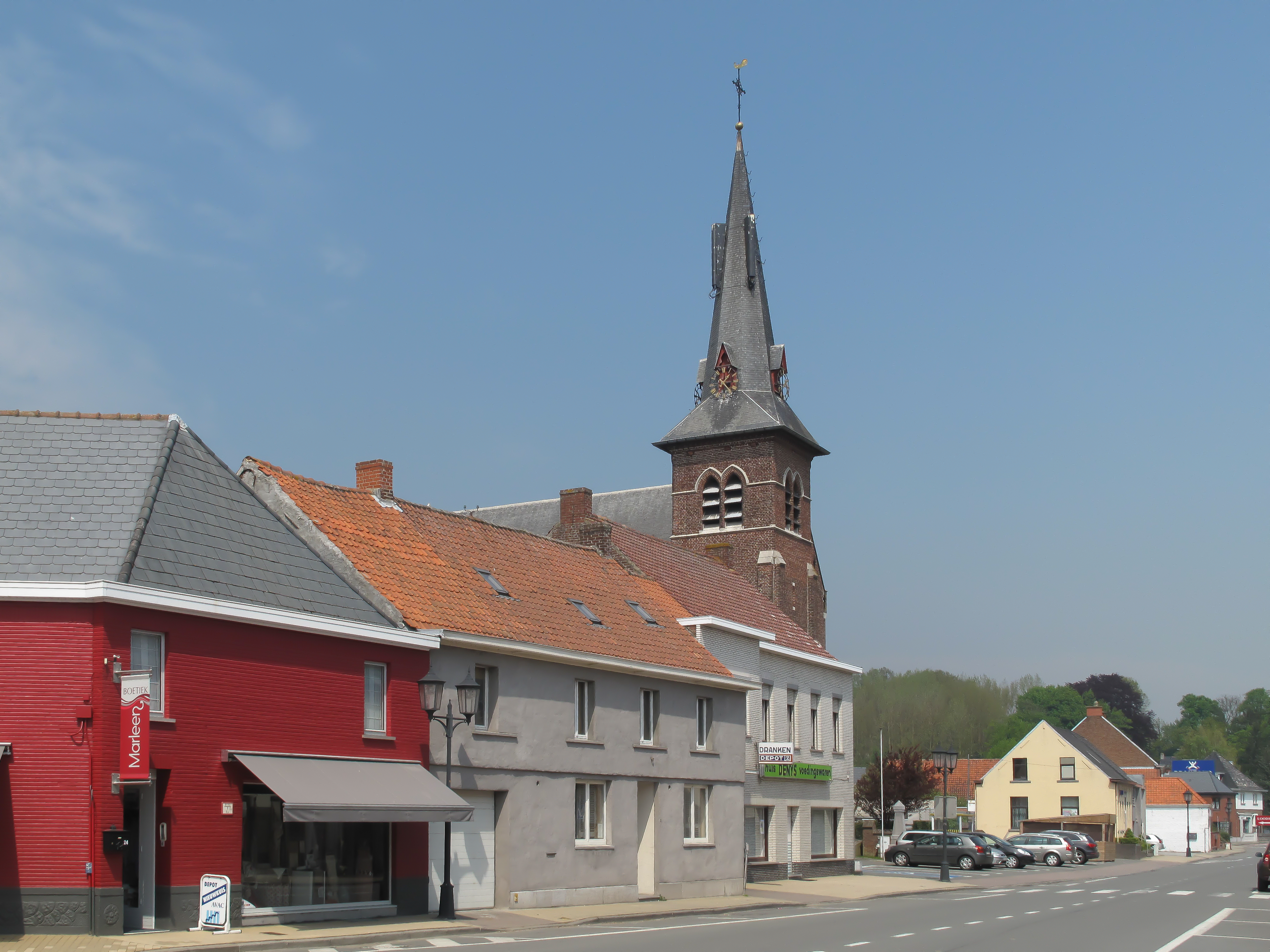

- Flag Coat of arms

- Location of Zwalm in East Flanders
- Interactive map of Zwalm
- Location in Belgium
- Coordinates: 50°53′N 03°44′E
- Country: Belgium
- Community: Flemish Community
- Region: Flemish Region
- Province: East Flanders
- Arrondissement: Oudenaarde

Government
  - Mayor: Bruno Tuybens (VoorZwalm)
  - Governing parties: VoorZwalm, CD&V-Plus, N-VA

Area
  - Total: 33.88 km^{2} (13.08 sq mi)

Population (2018-01-01)
  - Total: 8,134
  - Density: 240.1/km^{2} (621.8/sq mi)
- Postal codes: 9630, 9636
- NIS code: 45065
- Area codes: 055, 09
- Website: www.zwalm.be

Zwalm (Dutch pronunciation: [ˈzʋɑl(ə)m]) is a municipality located in Flanders, in the Flemish province of East Flanders, in Belgium. The municipality comprises the villages of Beerlegem, Dikkele, Hermelgem, Hundelgem, Meilegem, Munkzwalm, Nederzwalm, Paulatem, Roborst, Rozebeke, Sint-Blasius-Boekel, Sint-Denijs-Boekel and Sint-Maria-Latem. In 2021, Zwalm had a total population of 8,244. The total area is 33.82 km^{2}.

== Gallery ==
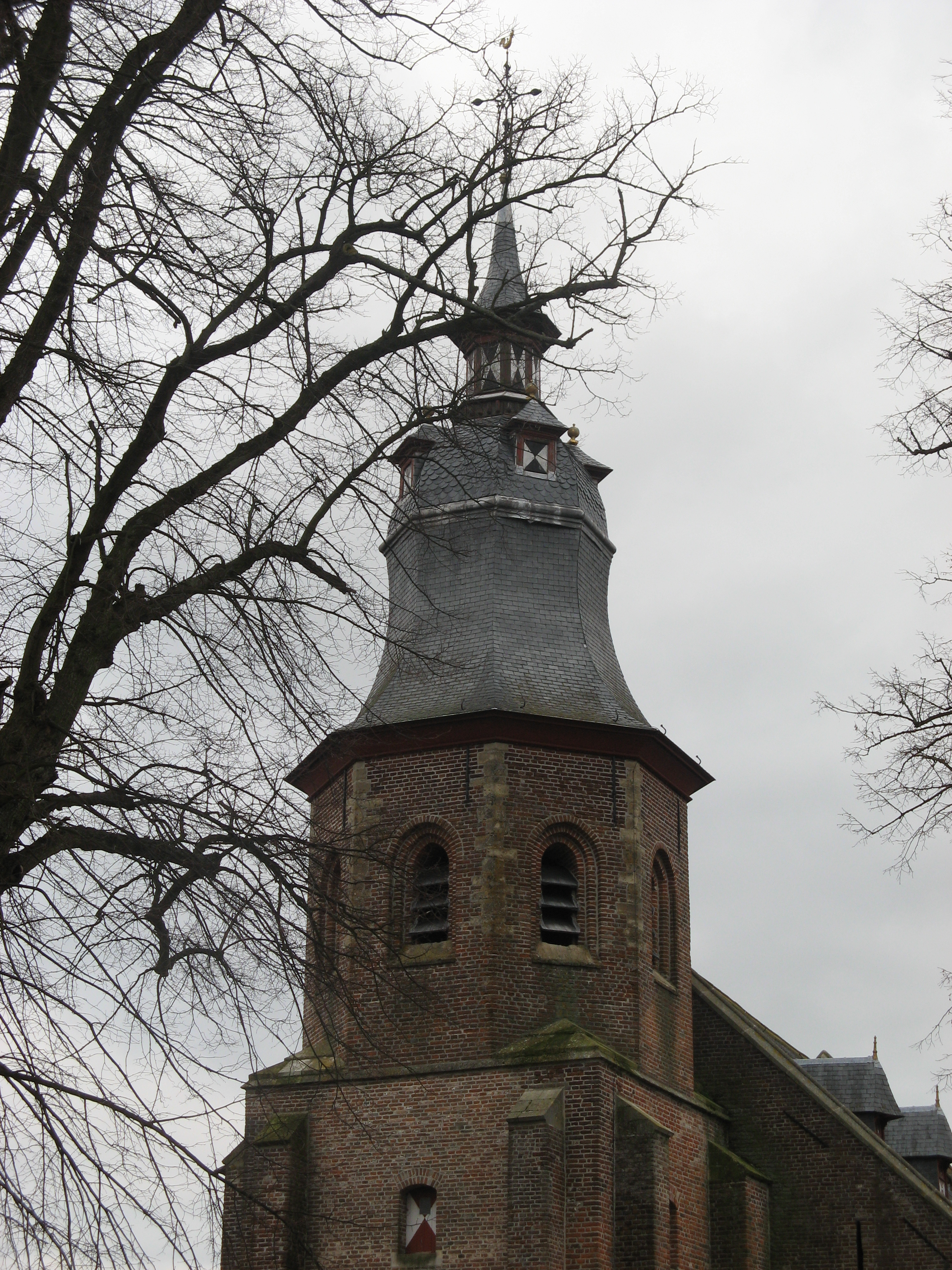
Church of Roborst

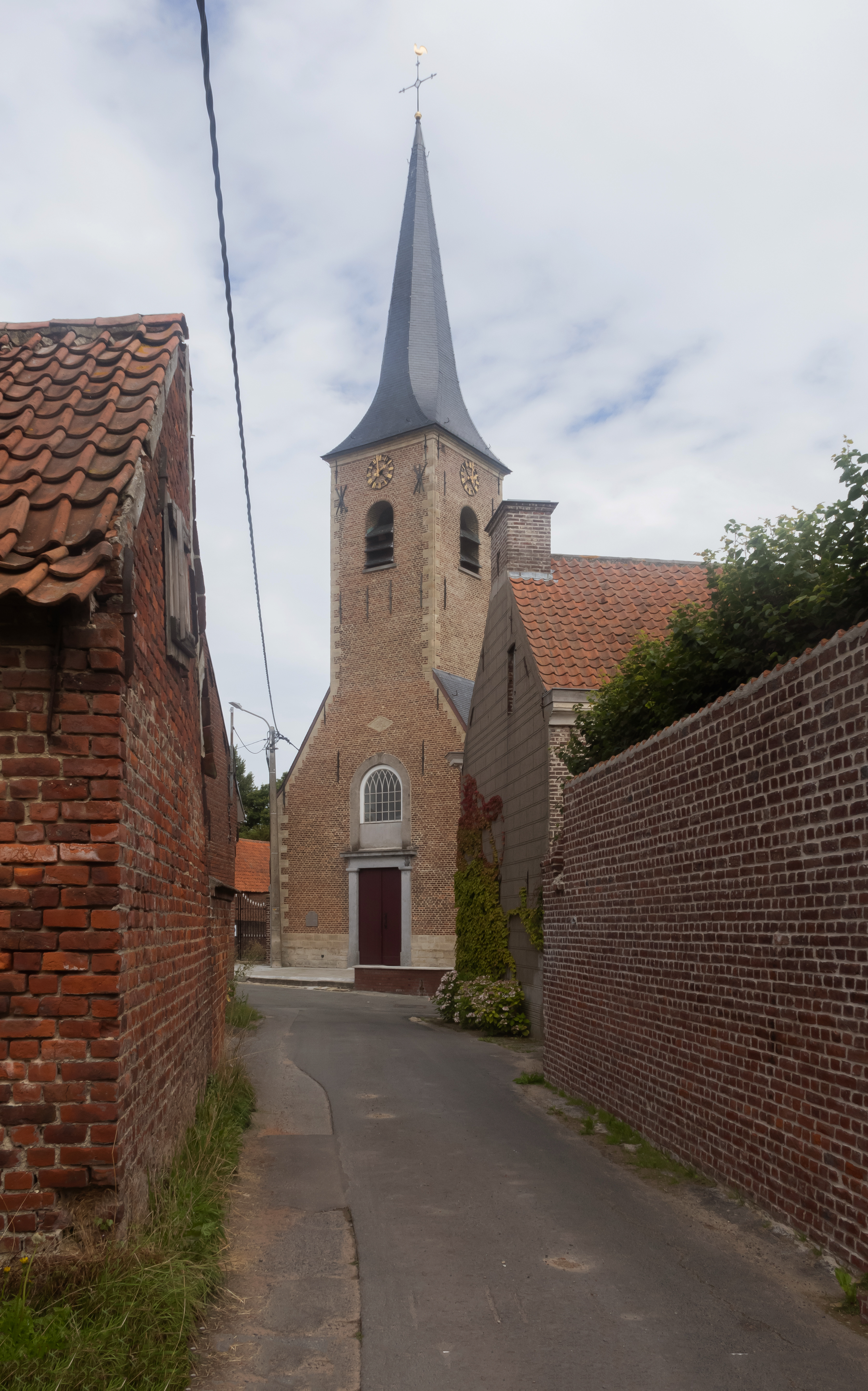
Hundelgem, church: Sint-Amanduskerk

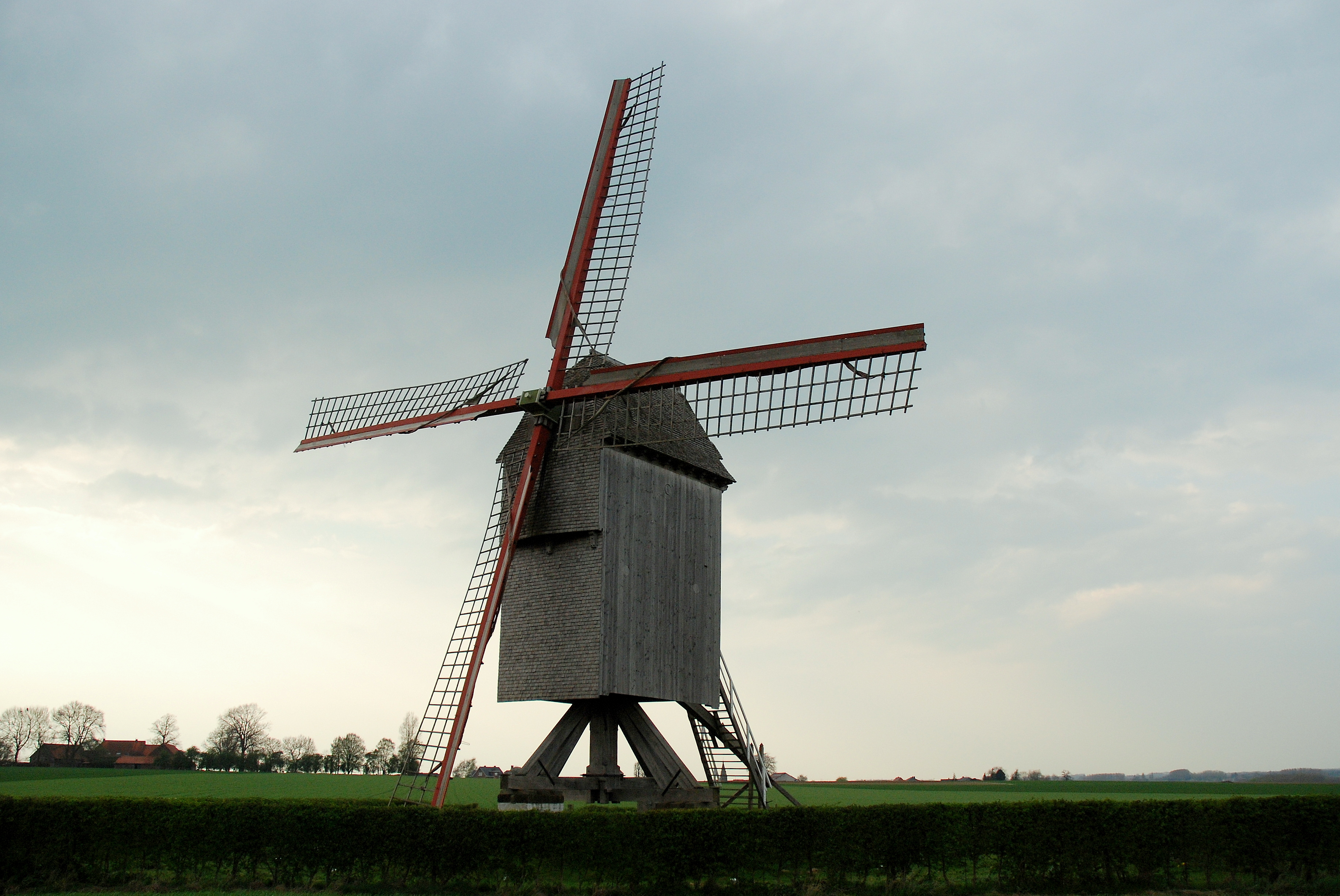
Vinkemolen Wind Mill in Franskouter, Sint-Denijs-Boekel

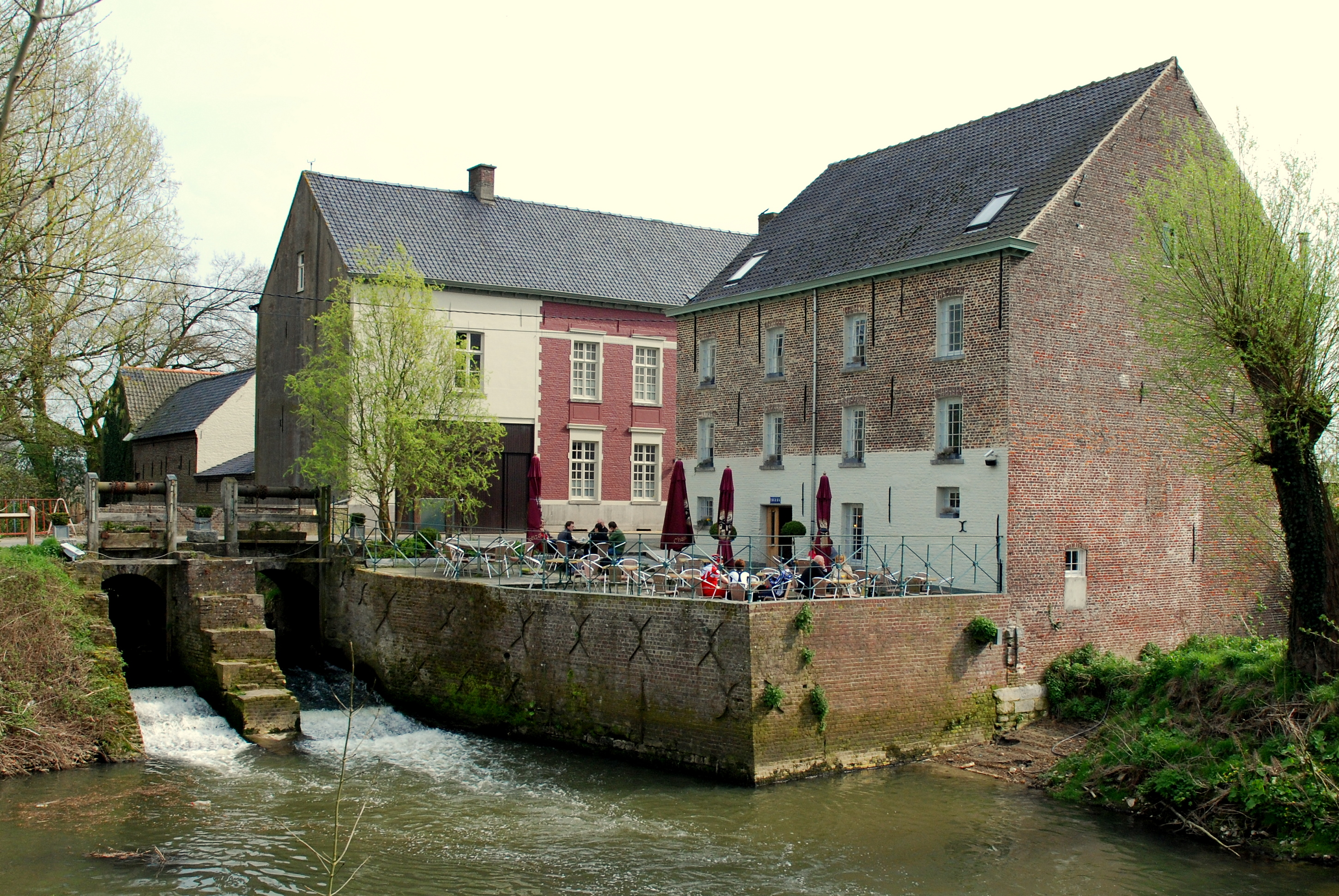
Water mill in Nederzwalm
