= Gantkofel (Mendelkamm) =

Mountain in Italy

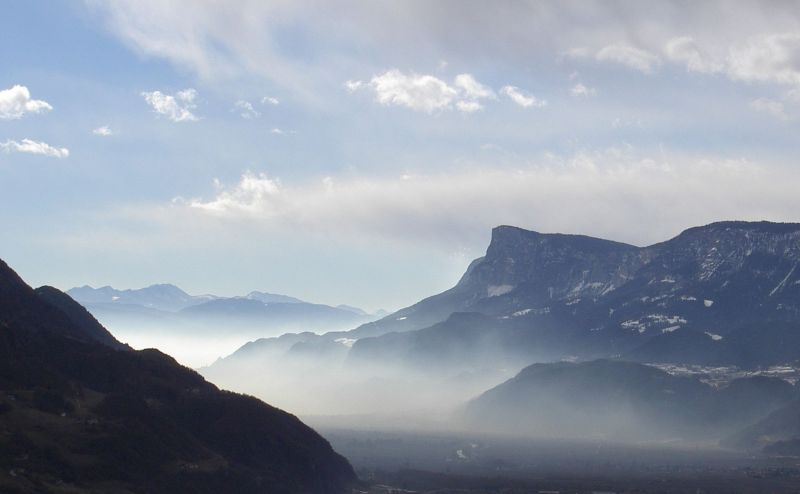

Highest point
- Elevation: 1,866 m (6,122 ft)
- Coordinates: 46°29′18″N 11°12′38″E

Geography
- Location within Alps
- Location: South Tyrol, Italy
- Parent range: Nonsberg group

The Gantkofel is a mountain of the Nonsberg group in South Tyrol, Italy.
