= Velzeke-Ruddershove =

- Double village
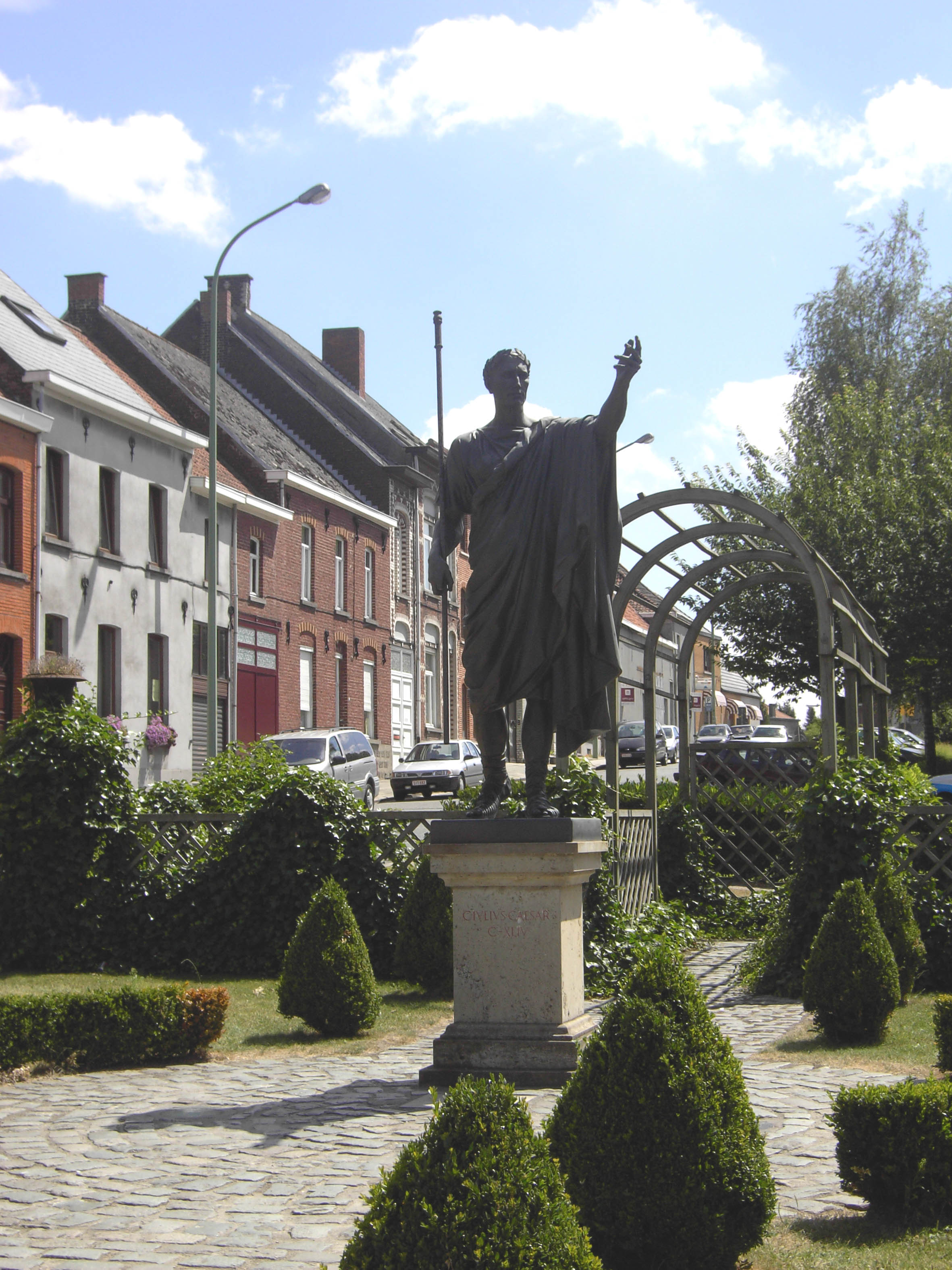
- Statue of Julius Caesar in village center of Velzeke (2006)

- Location in Belgium
- Coordinates: 50.8825°N 3.7828°E
- Country: Belgium
- Region: Flemish Region
- Province: East Flanders
- Municipality: Zottegem

Area
  - Total: 13.23 km^{2} (5.11 sq mi)

Population (2021)
  - Total: 3,315
  - Density: 250.6/km^{2} (649.0/sq mi)
- Time zone: CET

Velzeke-Ruddershove is a double village in the Denderstreek in the province of East Flanders in Belgium, currently part of the municipality of Zottegem.

The two villages of Velzeke and Ruddershove were merged in 1825. The settlement of Velzeke dates back from at least the Roman era, when it was a vicus situated at a crossroads in the network of Roman roads in Gallia Belgica. The archaeological museum of Velzeke exhibits findings from that period. The municipality merged into Zottegem in 1970.

== History ==
The village of Velzeke was first mentioned in 1015 as Felsecum; Ruddershove was first mention in 1053 as Rotgeri Curtis. The villages were part of the Land of Zottegem. In 1825, the villages which had grown together where merged in a single municipality. In 1970, the municipality was merged in Zottegem.

In 2007, the Flemish Tourism Agency held a competition to elect the most beautiful Flemish village. Velzeke-Ruddershove was one of the 50 nominated villages.

== Velzeke hoard ==
A hoard of third-century Roman coins has been discovered at Velzeke, including 91 denarii (ranging in date from the reign of Septimius Severus to that of Gordian III) and 93 antoniniani (ranging in date from the reign of Elagabalus to that of Postumus).

== Notable people ==
- Jan de Lichte (1723–1748), gang leader.
- Lyne Renée (1979), actress and artist.

== Sources ==
- L. van Durme, Toponymie van Velzeke-Ruddershove en Bochoute, 2 parts in 3 volumes. Koninklijke Academie voor Nederlandse Taal- en Letterkunde, ser. 6, no. 117. Ghent, 1986–1988. ISBN 90-72474-01-5 ISBN 907247404X
- J. van Heesch and J. Deschieter, De Gallo-Romeinse vicus te Velzeke II. Een muntschat uit de tijd van keizer Postumus (Zottegem, 2000).
- Marcel Thirion, "Le trésor de Zottegem - Velzeke II: argent jusqu’à Postume", Cercle des Etudes Numismatiques. Bulletin 11:1 (1974), pp. 12–15.
- Marcel Thirion, "Le trésor de Zottegem - Velzeke III: bronzes jusqu’à Hadrien", Cercle des Etudes Numismatiques. Bulletin 11:2 (1974), p. 70.
