= Meilegem =

- Village
- Interactive map of Meilegem
- Coordinates: 50°53′N 3°43′E
- Country: Belgium
- Region: Flanders
- Province: East Flanders
- Municipality: Zwalm

Area
  - Total: 2.00 km^{2} (0.77 sq mi)

Population (30 January 2001)
  - Total: 356
  - Density: 178/km^{2} (460/sq mi)
- Postal code: 9630

Meilegem is a village in the Flemish Region of Belgium, located in the province of East Flanders. It is a submunicipality of Zwalm.

== History ==
Archaeological evidence indicates that the area of Meilegem was already inhabited during prehistoric times, with artefacts dating back to the Pleistocene. Finds from the Neolithic or Early Bronze Age, including polished flint axes, as well as traces of habitation from the Gallo-Roman period, have been discovered. Medieval ceramic shards of the "Pingsdorf" type have also been found. A branch of the Gallo-Roman road from Bavay to Ghent passed near the boundary with Beerlegem.

The village was first mentioned in 1130 as Meylengem, derived from the Germanic Malinga-heim. Historically, it formed part of the Land of Aalst and belonged to the baanderij of Gavere. The patronage rights of the parish church were held by the Our Lady's Abbey of Affligem. Until 1701, the church was served by the pastor of Beerlegem.

== Geography ==
Meilegem is a Scheldt village covering approximately 200 hectares, located in sandy loam Flanders along the Upper Scheldt river. The terrain is undulating, with elevations ranging from 12 to 48 metres, including a steep slope towards the Scheldt valley northeast of the village centre. The soils are fertile and well-drained sandy loam and clay.

The village borders Dikkelvenne (Gavere) to the north, Beerlegem to the east, Paulatem to the southeast (separated by the Munkbosbeek), Sint-Maria-Latem and Nederzwalm-Hermelgem to the south, and Zingem to the west. A notable landscape feature is the so-called "Saksenboom", a lime tree located at a road junction in the northeastern part of the village.

== Landmarks ==
The parish church of Meilegem, dedicated to Saint Martin, was rebuilt in 1784 in a classicist style. The parish is currently served again by the pastor of Beerlegem, while the former rectory is rented out to private individuals.

== Economy and infrastructure ==
Meilegem has historically been a predominantly agricultural community. Today, it is characterized as a rural residential village with a small centre and scattered buildings, with only a few farms still in operation.
