= Jan de Lichte =

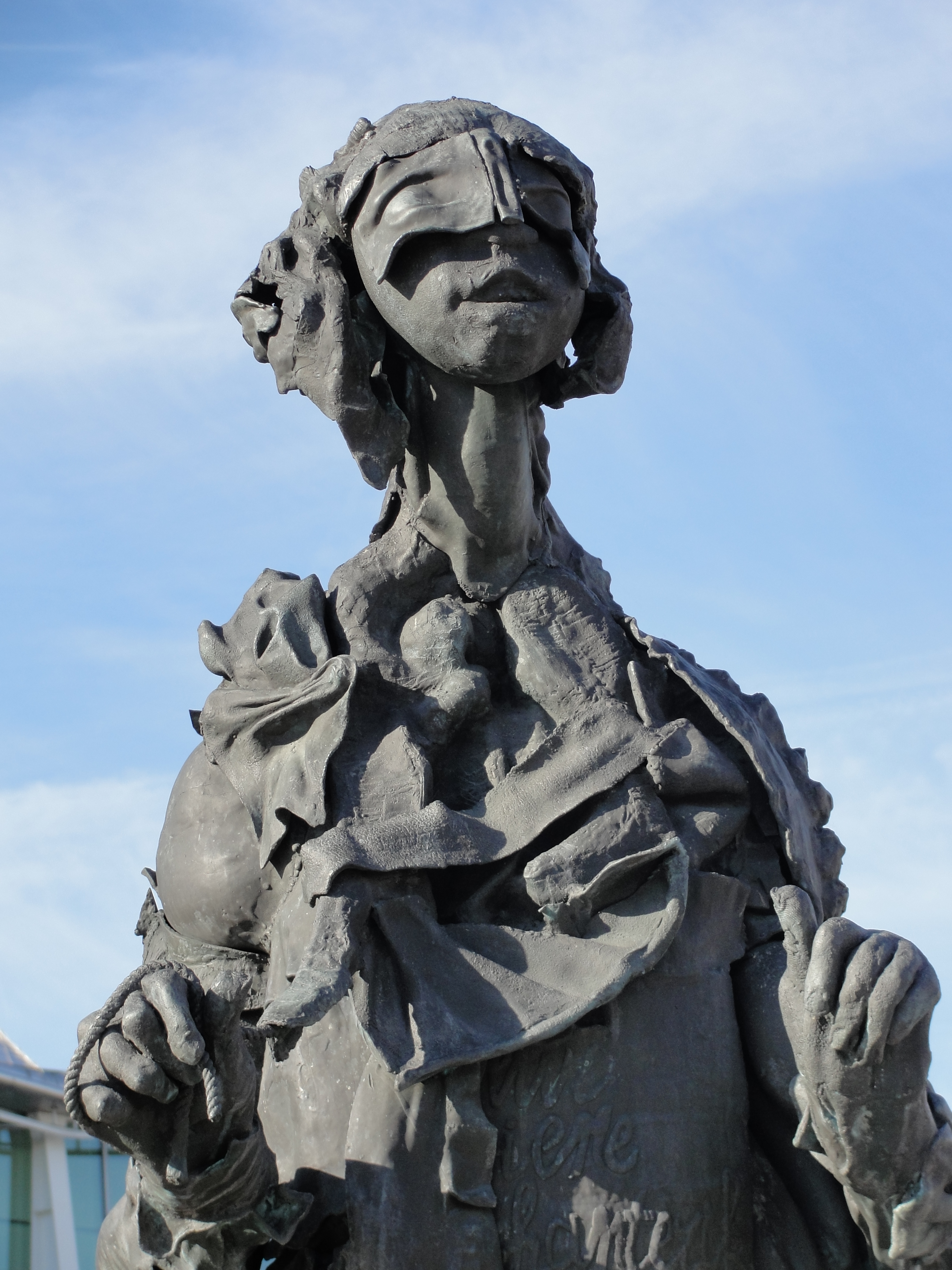
- Jan de Lichte as depicted by Roel D'Haese
- Born: Johannes de Lichte; 7 April 1723; Velzeke, County of Flanders, Austrian Netherlands
- Died: 13 November 1748 (aged 25); Aalst, County of Flanders, Austrian Netherlands
- Occupations: Outlaw and gang leader
- Years active: 1737–1748

Joannes "Jan" De Lichte (7 April 1723 – 13 November 1748) was an 18th-century Flemish outlaw and gang leader. Motivated by poverty during the upheavals of the Austrian War of Succession (1740–48), de Lichte led a gang of bandits who committed burglaries, robberies, and several murders in Flanders. Captured and executed in 1748, he was subsequently rehabilitated in the fictional works of Louis Paul Boon in 1958 and has subsequently inspired a sculpture and film series.

== Biography ==
Jan De Lichte was born on 7 April 1723 in Velzeke in the County of Flanders to an impoverished peasant family with a long criminal history. In 1737, he was arrested for the first time in Wetteren for theft. He enlisted in the Austrian and later Dutch armies but deserted from both and began a life of criminality. The Austrian War of Succession started in 1740 and lasted until 1748. In 1743, De Lichte and his gang shot at two pilgrims in Zottegem during a robbery. Between 2 and 22 June 1744, the Hanoverian Army was stationed in Velzeke where De Lichte lived at the time, and left the village ruined and plundered. The war also caused an overall lawlessness which resulted in an increase of the activities of De Lichte and his gang. Jan De Lichte used the dense forests of the Munkbosbeek valley, part of the Flemish Ardennes, as a hiding place.

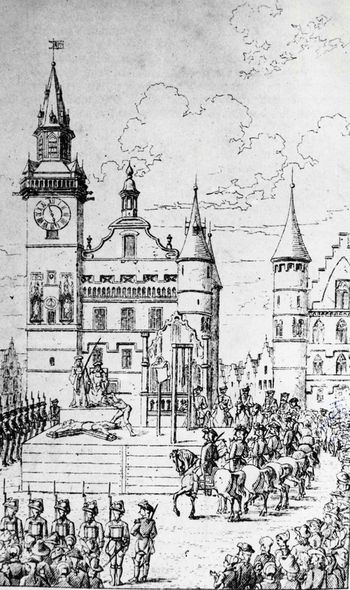
Execution of Jan de Lichte in 1748

The Treaty of Aix-la-Chapelle of 1748 ended the hostilities. The ceasefire resulted in a greater emphasis on internal problems in the region. On 16 August 1748, the body of Marianne De Smet was discovered who had been shot and stabbed multiple times. De Lichte and his wife were considered the primary suspects for the crime. On 28 September, the French occupying forces organized a manhunt against De Lichte and his gang. Soon after, he was arrested, and found guilty of four murders, two attempted murders, and at least 30 counts of robbery and burglary. De Lichte was executed on 13 November 1748 on the wheel in the market square of Aalst. Between 8 October and 14 December 1748, 101 members of the gang were tried, six including De Lichte were put on the wheel, 19 were hanged, and the remainder were sent to the galleys.

== Aftermath ==
The activity of the gang and its end were the source of inspiration for legends and folk legends. Nowadays Jan De Lichte is also known by Louis Paul Boon's literary interpretation in his 1957 novel De bende van Jan De Lichte, which presents De Lichte as not merely a highwayman but as a champion of the oppressed lower classes, a kind of Flemish Robin Hood.

Roel D'Haese was commissioned to create a statue of Jan De Lichte by the Louis Paul Boon Society. It was supposed to be placed on the market in Aalst, however the municipality refused to honour a criminal. Next it was offered to Zottegem only to be refused again. In 1987, it was placed in the Middelheim Open Air Sculpture Museum. In 2009, the statue was finally publicly displayed in front of the Palace of Justice in Antwerp.

Since 2005, Jan De Lichte is honoured by a dubble witbier brewed by De Glazen Toren Brewery in Mere in the municipality of Erpe-Mere.

The Flemish channel VTM made the 10-part historical costume series Thieves of the Wood, which was released on Flemish television and Netflix on 2 January 2020.

== See also ==
- Ludovicus Baekelandt (1774–1803), West Flemish highwayman.
- Buckriders, 18th century criminal bands active in Limburg
