= Grote Markt, Aalst =

Square in Aalst, Belgium

Grote Markt
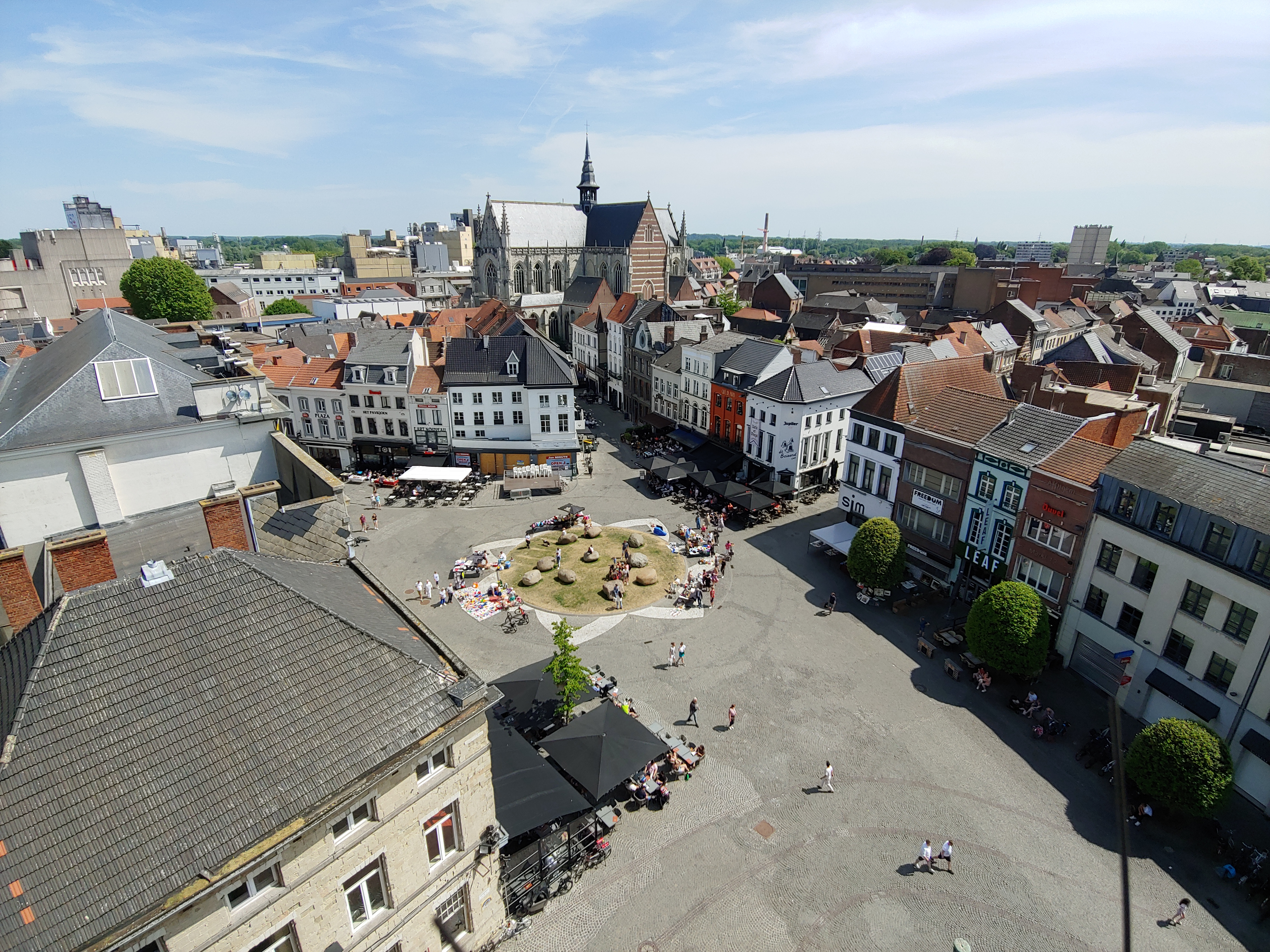
- Aalst photographed from the Schepenhuis

- Location within Belgium
- Location: Aalst, East Flanders, Belgium
- Coordinates: 50°56′18″N 4°02′20″E

The Grote Markt (Dutch, pronounced [ˌɣroːtə ˈmɑr(ə)kt], Aalsters: Groeite Mert; meaning "Big Market") is the central square of Aalst, East Flanders, Belgium. The Schepenhuis (Aldermen's House), the Town Hall, the Beurs van Amsterdam and the Herberg Graaf van Egmont are located there. The Grote Markt is an UNESCO buffer zone as well, thanks to the Schepenhuis.

The large square is broken by the protruding position of the Aldermen's House and the Herberg Graaf van Egmont, and is partly divided into several parts. The square behind the Aldermen's House (on Kattestraat) and the connecting street to Hopmarkt and Nieuwstraat are also referred to as part of the Grote Markt. The statue of printer Dirk Martens is also located on the square.

The Grote Markt witnessed many tragic events unfold during its history. In 1524, the first female Protestant martyr Clara 't Roen was executed on the square. More than two centuries later, in 1748, the outlaw and gang leader Jan de Lichte suffered the same fate.

== Events hosted on the square ==
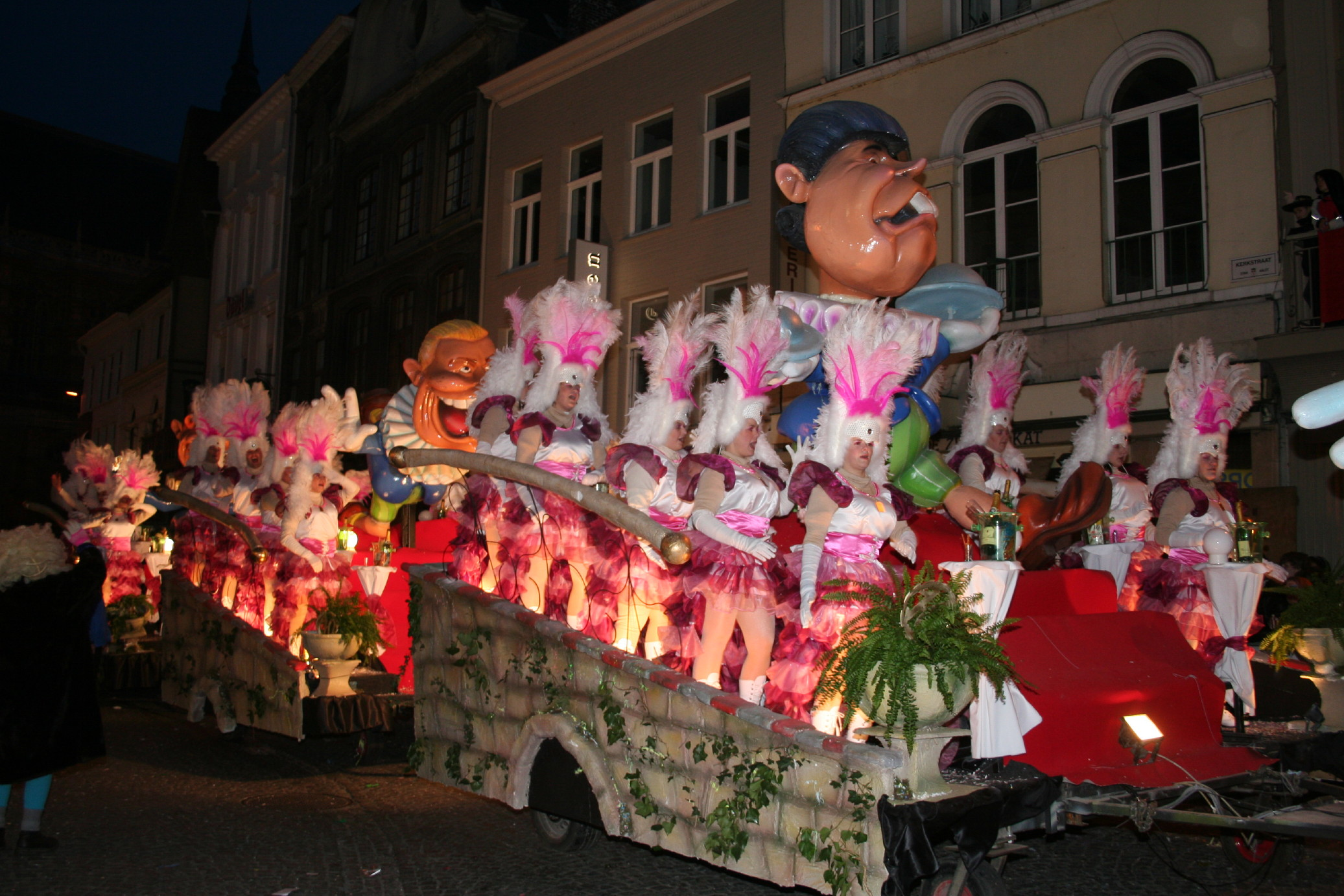
Carnival at the Grote Markt

- Every year, the Grote Markt is the main meeting place for the Carnival of Aalst. In 2022, when Carnival was not organised by the city due to the COVID-19 pandemic in Belgium, local Carnival-goers met up there to celebrate. Since 2022, the market square has functioned as the location to announce the winner of Prince Carnival. The traditional "doll burning" and "onion throw" are also held on the square.
- The Grote Markt is also used to host concerts, often on the Day of the Flemish Community.
- De Catharinisten, a 600 year old theatrical troupe, celebrated their 600th birthday on the Grote Markt.

== Gallery ==
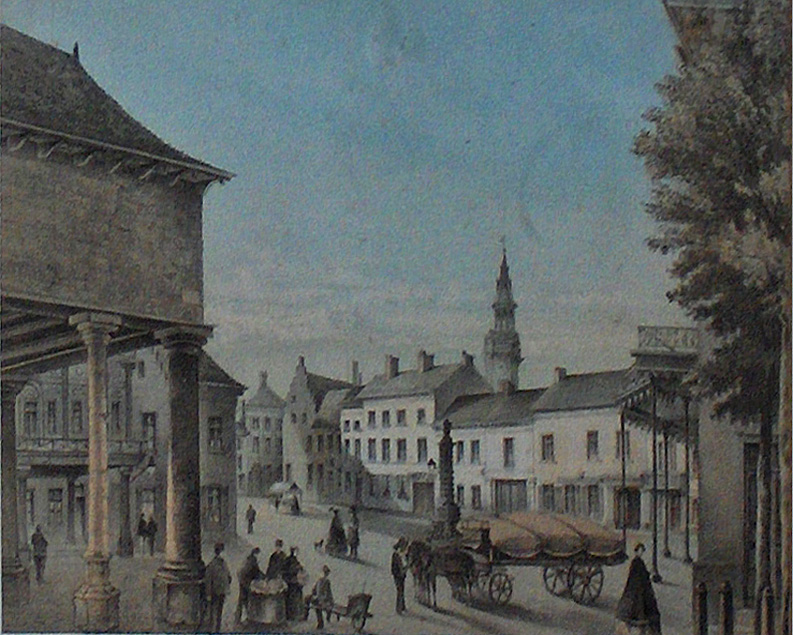
A coloured etching of the Hopmarkt of Aalst, depicted in the 19th century. The Hopmarkt is connected to the Nieuwstraat. The belfry tower is visible in the background.

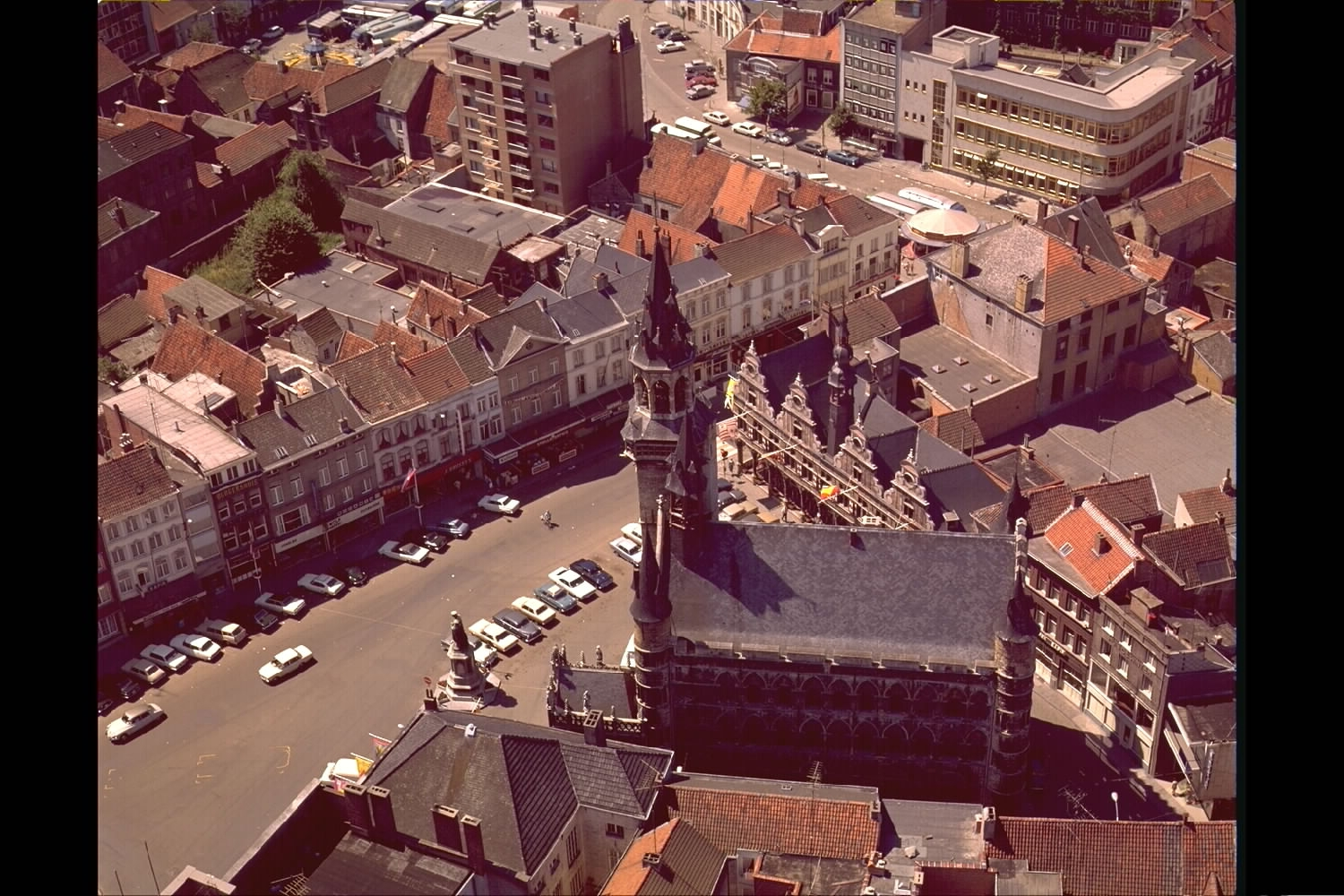
Aerial view of the Grote Markt in 1970

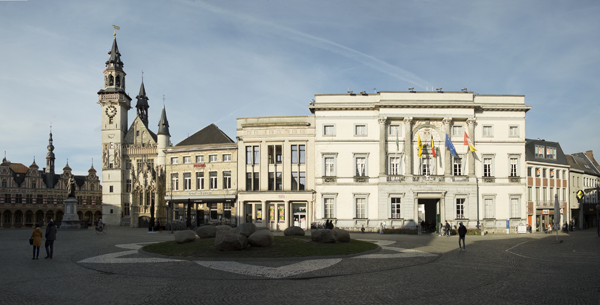
View of the Grote Markt today

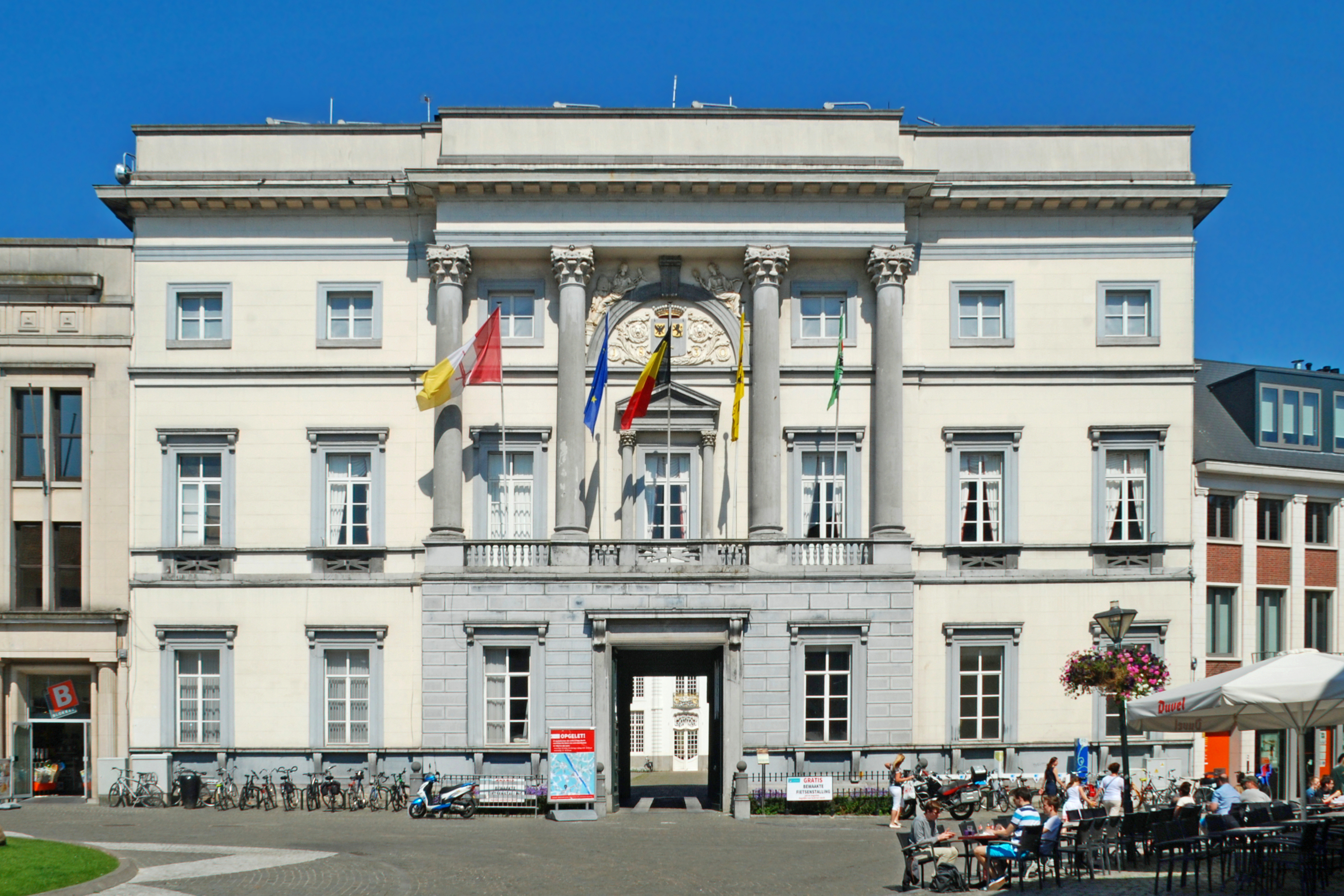
Town Hall

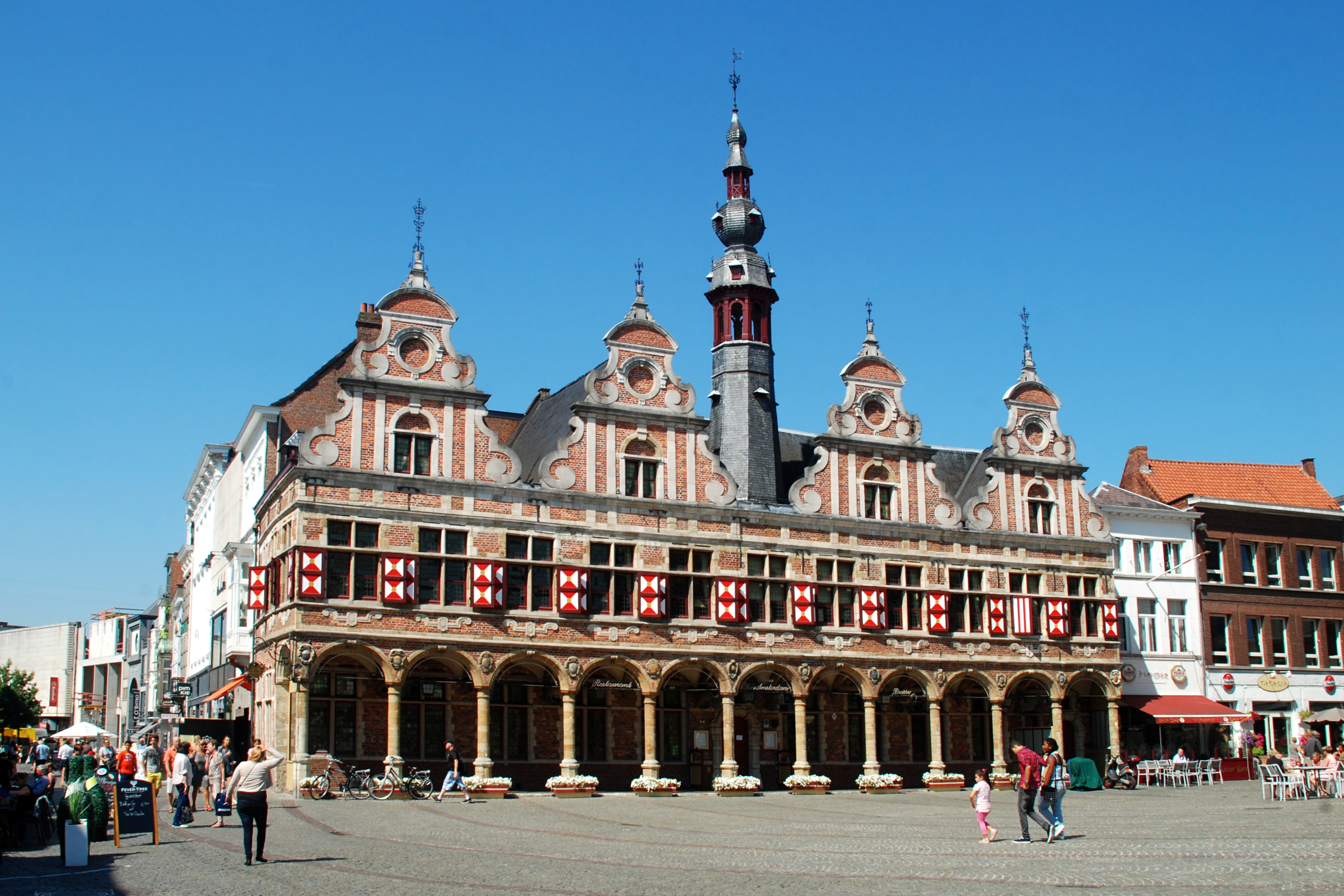
Beurs van Amsterdam

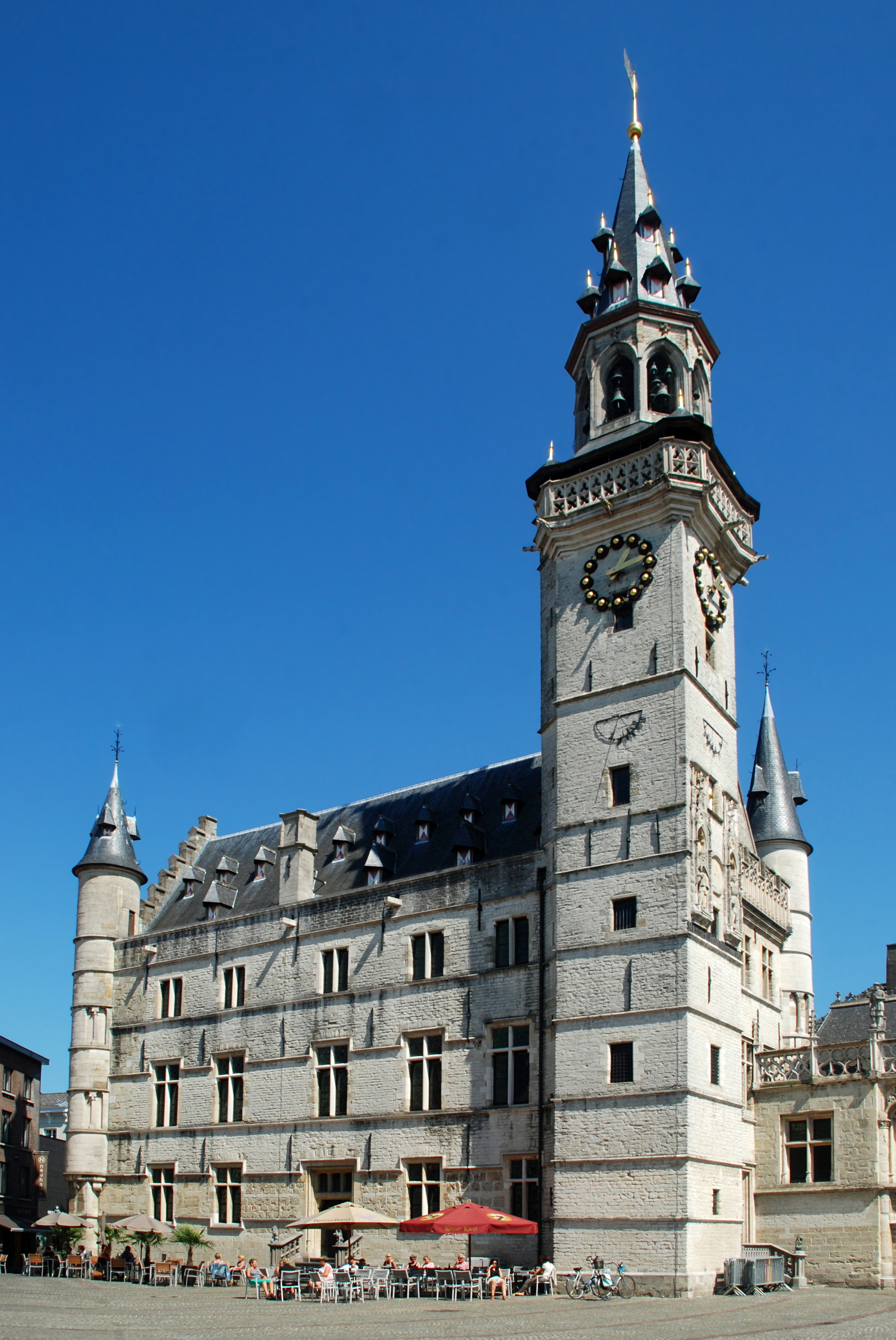
Belfry and Schepenhuis

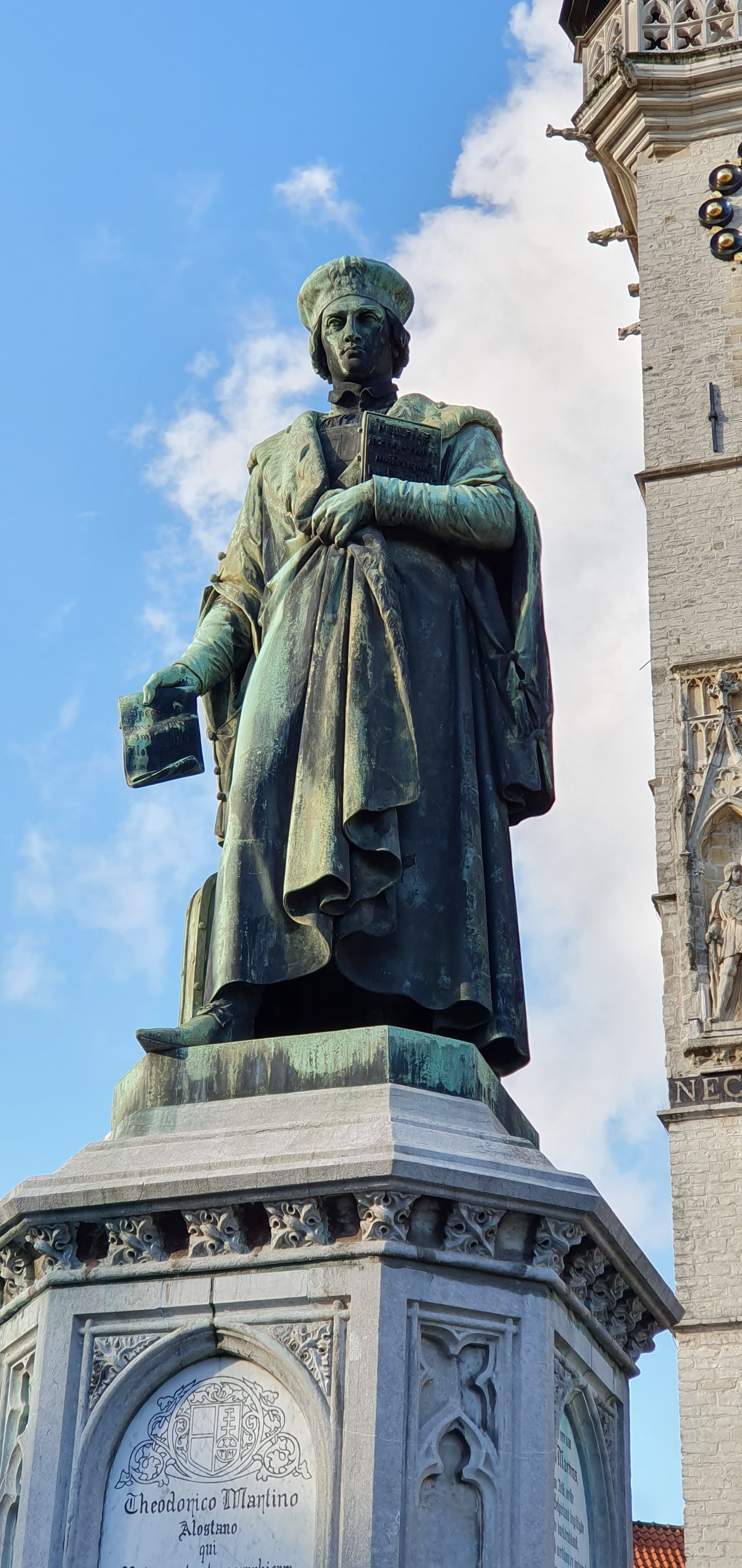
Statue of Dirk Martens

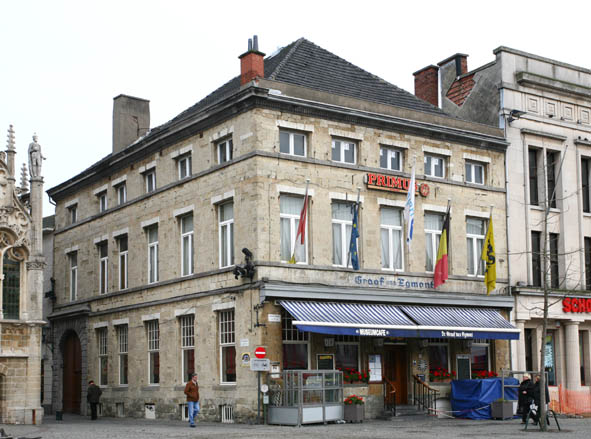
Graaf van Egmont
