= Katrina Roen =

New Zealand psychology / sociology academic

- Education: University of Canterbury
- Scientific career
- Fields: Psychology / sociology
- Workplaces: University of Waikato
- Thesis: Constructing transsexuality: Discursive manoeuvres through psycho-medical, transgender, and queer texts (1998)

Katrina Roen is a New Zealand psychology / sociology academic, and as of 2019 is a full professor at the University of Waikato. She was formerly a visiting researcher at the University of Oslo.

== Academic career ==
After a 1998 PhD titled 'Constructing transsexuality: Discursive manoeuvres through psycho-medical, transgender, and queer texts' at the University of Canterbury, Roen took up a series of academic posts in Wellington, Lancaster, and then Oslo where she became a visiting researcher.

== Selected works ==
- Popay, Jennie, Helen Roberts, Amanda Sowden, Mark Petticrew, Lisa Arai, Mark Rodgers, Nicky Britten, Katrina Roen, and Steven Duffy. "Guidance on the conduct of narrative synthesis in systematic reviews." A product from the ESRC methods programme Version 1 (2006): b92.
- Roen, Katrina. "" Either/Or" and" Both/Neither": Discursive Tensions in Transgender Politics—TEST." Signs: Journal of Women in Culture and Society 27, no. 2 (2002): 501-522.
- McDermott, Elizabeth, Katrina Roen, and Jonathan Scourfield. "Avoiding shame: Young LGBT people, homophobia and self‐destructive behaviours." Culture, Health & Sexuality 10, no. 8 (2008): 815–829.
- Scourfield, Jonathan, Katrina Roen, and Liz McDermott. "Lesbian, gay, bisexual and transgender young people's experiences of distress: resilience, ambivalence and self‐destructive behaviour." Health & social care in the community 16, no. 3 (2008): 329–336.
- Roen, Katrina. "Transgender theory and embodiment: The risk of racial marginalisation." Journal of Gender Studies 10, no. 3 (2001): 253–263.
