= Beerlegem =

- Village
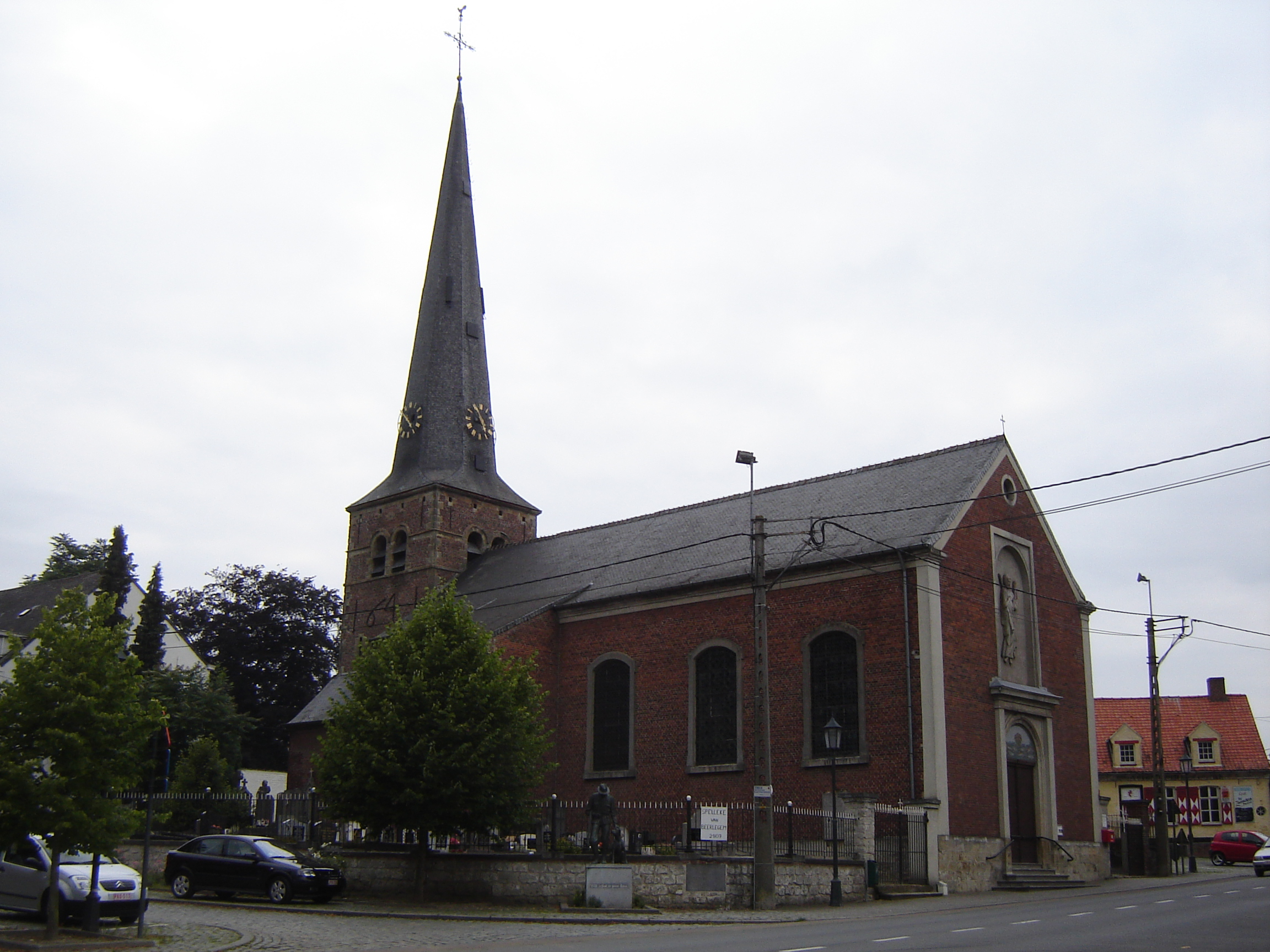
- Church of Beerlegem (2007)

- Coat of arms

- Location in Belgium
- Coordinates: 50.90552°N 3.71665°E
- Country: Belgium
- Region: Flemish Region
- Province: East Flanders
- Municipality: Zwalm

Area
  - Total: 2.29 km^{2} (0.88 sq mi)

Population (2021)
  - Total: 403
  - Density: 176/km^{2} (456/sq mi)
- Time zone: CET

Beerlegem is a village belonging to the municipality of Zwalm. It is located in the Flemish Ardennes, the hilly southern part of the province of East Flanders, Belgium. Until 1970, it was an independent municipality.

== History ==
During excavations in the 1950s and 1960s, a Merovingian graveyard was discovered containing 225 graves, and a unique wooden burial vault from the 11th or 12th century. The village was first mentioned as Berlengien in 1177, and used to belong to the Lands of Aalst. In 1682 the heerlijkheid was elevated to a barony.

In 1970, the municipality was merged into Munkzwalm which in turn was merged into Zwalm in 1977.

== Castle ==
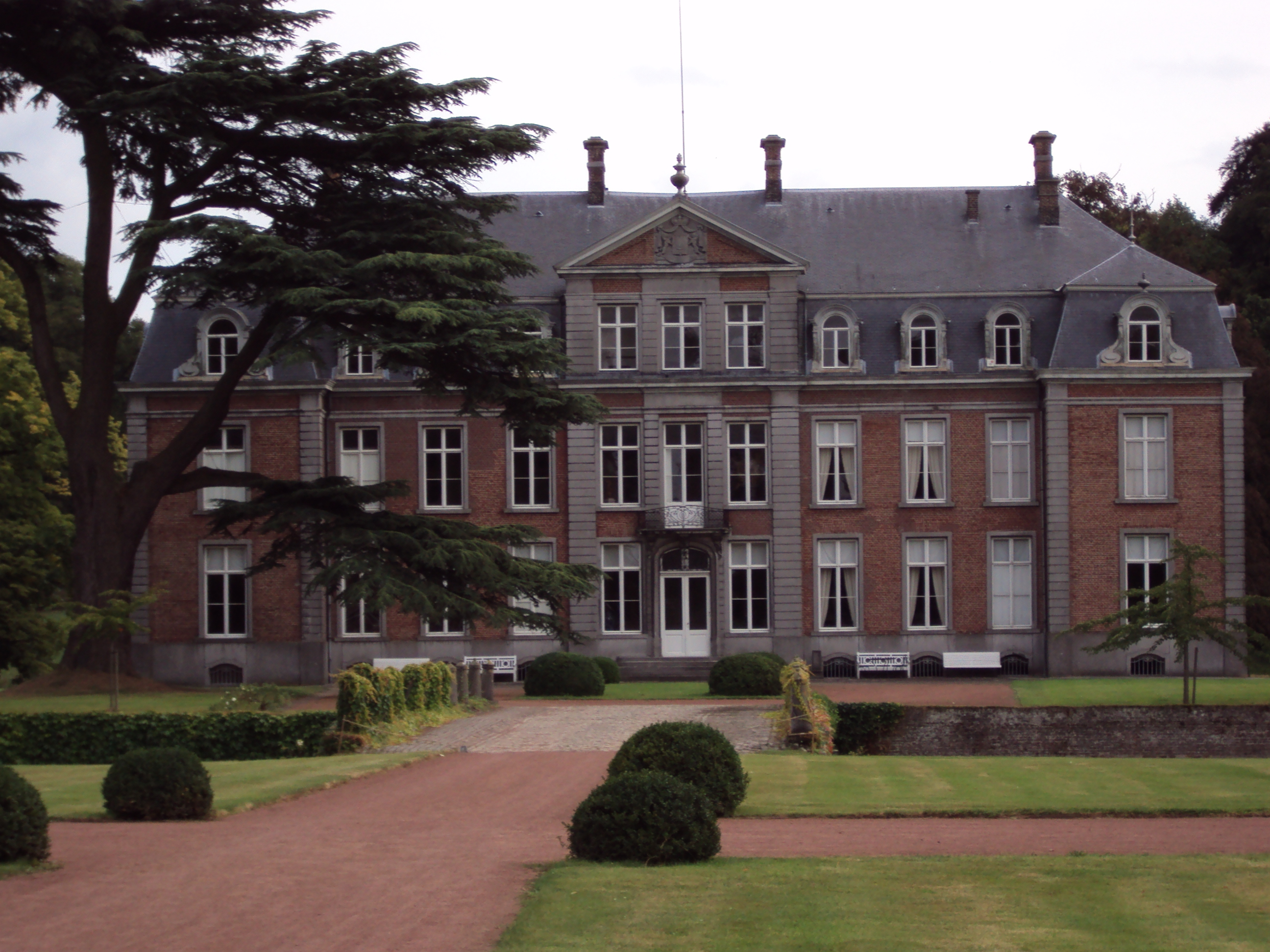
Castle Ten Bieze

Beerlegem is the location of an 18th-century Baroque castle, known as either Castle of Beerlegem or Castle Ten Bieze. The original castle was built in the 11th or 12th century. The current castle was built around 1730. It was repaired and extended after it was hit by a V-2 rocket in March 1945. The castle used to be the residence of the Marquess of Rode, but is nowadays the private property of the Count d'Ursel.

== Nature ==
A part of the Munkbosbeek Valley is located near the village. The forest was spared from deforestation by industry and roads, however a large part of the forest was turned into agricultural land in the early 19th century. The brook in the forest still follows its natural course. Jan de Lichte, the outlaw and gang leader, used the forest as a hiding place.

== Notable people ==
- Charles Philippe de Rodoan (c.1553–1616), bishop.
