= Røen =

Røen is a Norwegian surname. Notable people with the surname include:

- John Røen (1903–1979), Norwegian cross-country skier
- Sigurd Røen (1909–1992), Norwegian Nordic skier

== See also ==
- Roen (surname)
