= Wulveringem =

- Deelgemeente (part-municipality)
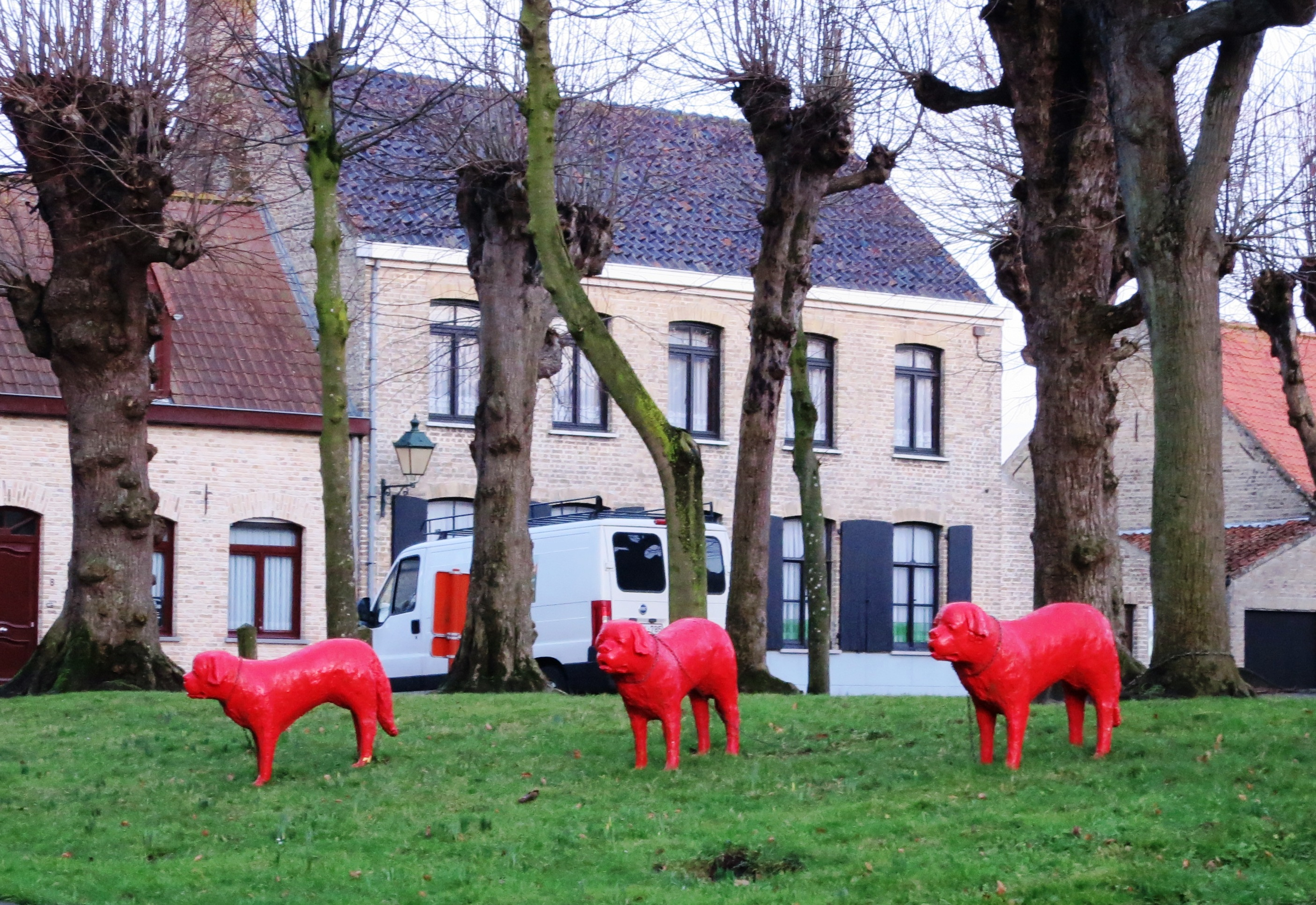
- Dogs in Wulveringem (2015)

- Coordinates: 51°00′51″N 02°39′14″E
- Country: Belgium
- Province: West Flanders
- Municipality: Veurne

Population (2011)
  - Total: 336
- Source: NIS
- Postal code: 8630

Wulveringem is a small agricultural and residential village in the Westhoek region of West Flanders, a short distance from the border with French Flanders. Wulveringem has a land area of 9.37 km^{2}: in 2011 there were 336 registered inhabitants.

Administratively Wulveringem has been controlled from Veurne since 1977. It was independently administered till 1971 after which, between 1971 and 1977, it was combined for administrative purposes with the adjacent village of Vinkem to form a new administrative unit called Beauvoorde. Although Beauvoorde's status as an independent administrative unit was short-lived, the name Beauvoorde continues in daily use.

The village also features the historic Beauvoorde Castle, originally dating back to the 12th century and rebuilt in the Flemish Renaissance style in the early 1600s. The castle was built by Jacob de Bryarde, bailiff of Veurne, around 1600, replacing an earlier non-fortified mansion that had been burned down by beggars in 1584. The new castle was designed by architect Sylvain Boullain.

During World War II, the village churchyard became the final resting place for 15 Commonwealth soldiers, a testament to its involvement in the defense of Belgium in May 1940.

== History ==
Wulveringem appears on a map from 1770 on which it is identified as "Wulveringhem". The village was barely smaller than it is today. The centre in 1770 consisted of 55 buildings, and well beyond the centre there were a number of large and small farms. The land is flat and often damp: about ten of the Wulveringem farms were partially or completely surrounded by moats. The church and the small cemetery around it were almost wholly circled by a moat as were two adjacent farms.

=== Population decline since 1830 ===
The registered population peaked in 1830 at 1,080 before the lure of higher wages in the industrializing towns and the mechanisation of agriculture led to a slow decline, to 822 in 1910. The population rose significantly by 1920, but then continued to decline, reaching 508 in 1970 and 336 in 2011.

== Visiting Wulveringem ==
The centre of the village has been carefully preserved/restored. It is sometimes possible to visit Beauvoorde Castle which is positioned across a moat to the south side of the church yard.

== Gallery ==
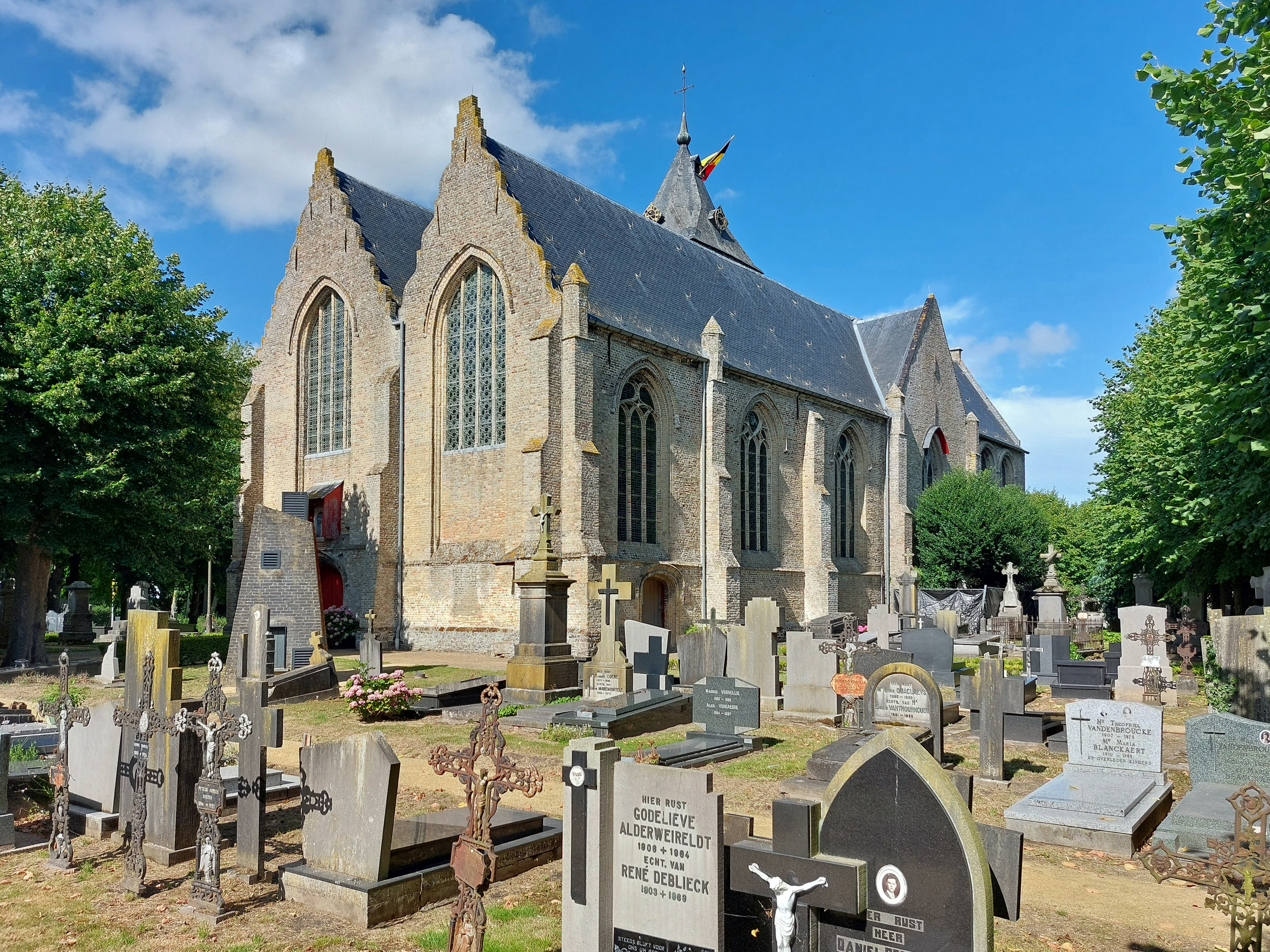
The church of Our Lady and the churchyard

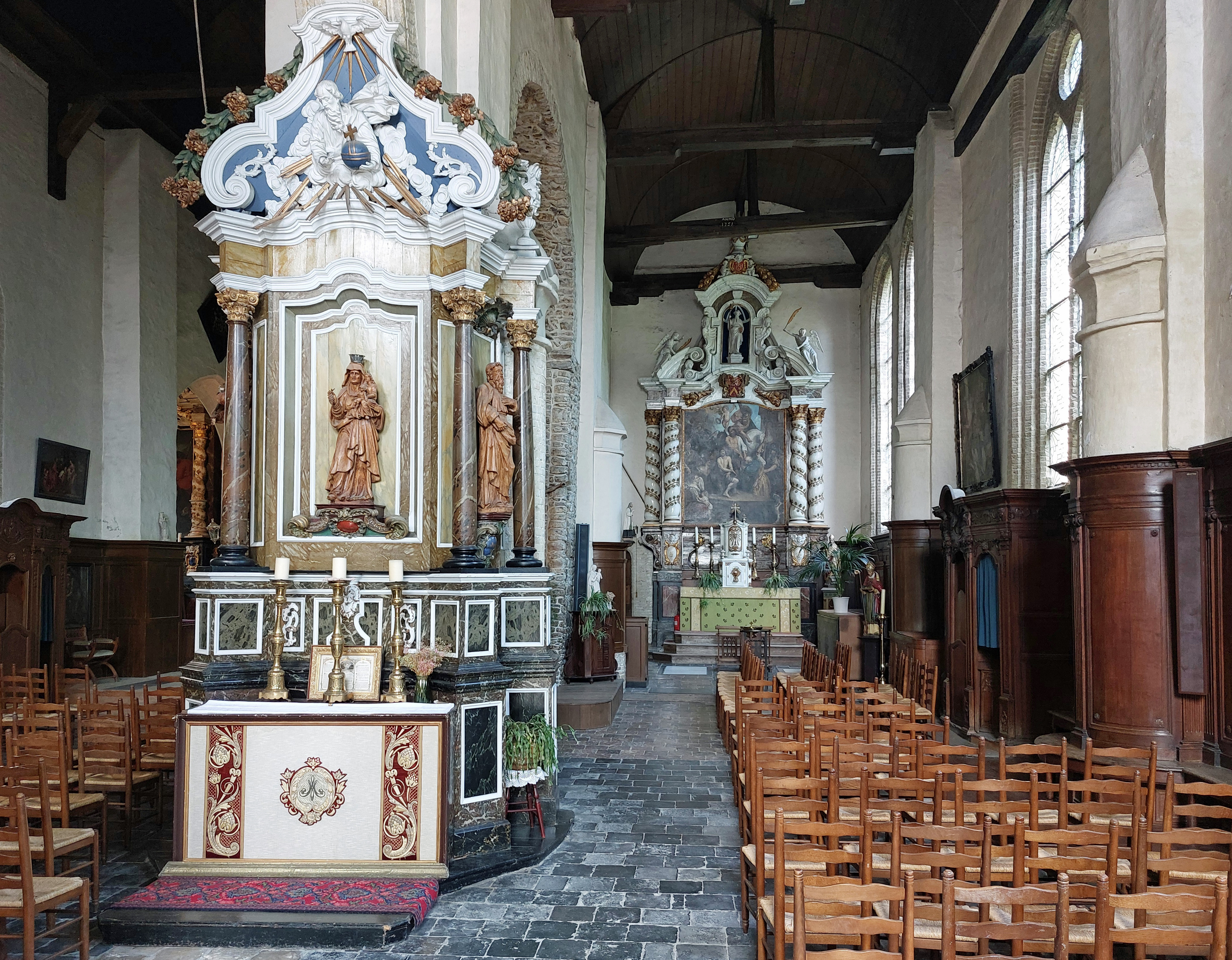
Interior of the church

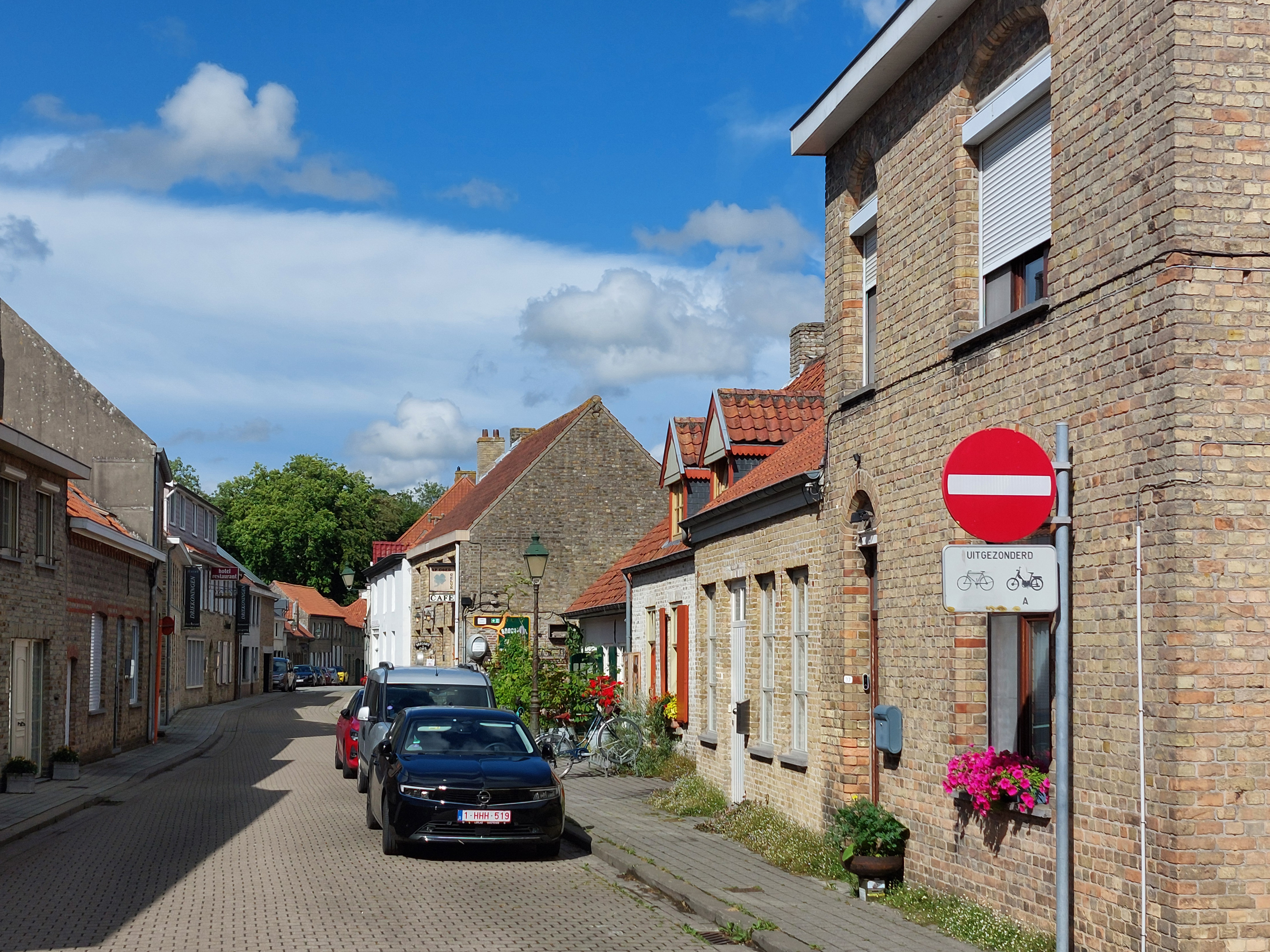
Street in the village
