= Clara 't Roen =

Flemish Lutheran

Clara 't Roen (died 1524, Aalst, Imperial Flanders), was a Flemish Lutheran.

In 1524, she was convicted of heresy and burned alive at the Grote Markt, the main square in Aalst, Belgium.

She was the first woman to be executed in the Southern-Netherlands (modern day Belgium) for being a Protestant.

A wheat beer has been named after Clara 't Roen.

In 2020, it was decided the city of Aalst is going to name a street after her.
