= Elizabeth McDermott =

British mental health inequality researcher

- Education: Lancaster University
- Scientific career
- Workplaces: Lancaster University
- Thesis: Hidden injuries, happy lives? : the influence of lesbian identity and social class on wellbeing (2002)

Elizabeth McDermott is a Professor of Health Inequality at Lancaster University, in England. Her research considers mental health inequality, with a focus on gender, social class and young people.

== Early life and education ==
McDermott earned her doctoral degree at the Lancaster University, where she studied the influence of lesbian identity and social class on wellbeing. She was a postdoctoral researcher on a project that looked to understand how people affected by cancer understood end of life issues.

== Research and career ==
In 2006 McDermott joined the University of York as an assistant professor. She returned to Lancaster University in 2013. From 2014 McDermott led the Department of Health and Social Care study into LGBT youth suicide. The research programme looked to understand why LGBT young people have a higher risk of suicide than their heterosexual counterparts. The programme came to be known as Queer Futures, and identified that 70% of young people have experienced discrimination or bullying related to their sexual orientation. She also identified that 4 out of 5 young people hid their sexual orientation or gender identity, and those that hide their gender identity are almost two times as likely to self-harm. The study contributed to the SAGE Encyclopaedia of LGBTQ Studies. The LBGT youth suicide project expanded into the National Institute for Health Research Queer Futures 2, which looks to improve the mental health provision for LGBT young people. Queer Futures 2 partnered with The Blueprint study, which looked at community-based mental health provision. McDermott has worked with the National Health Service to implement findings based on her research, including LGBT awareness training, remarking that ‘We need to provide safe and non-judgemental environments for young people to talk about their sexualities, and mental health services outside the clinical environment’.

McDermot serves on the board of trustees of the Consortium of Lesbian, Gay, Bisexual and Transgender Voluntary and Community Organisations.

== Selected publications ==
Her publications include;

- McDermott, Elizabeth; Roen, Katrina; Scourfield, Jonathan (2008-11-01). "Avoiding shame: young LGBT people, homophobia and self-destructive behaviours". Culture, Health & Sexuality. 10 (8): 815–829. doi:10.1080/13691050802380974. ISSN 1369-1058. PMID 18975229. S2CID 2215912.
- McDermott, Elizabeth; Graham, Hilary (2005-03-01). "Resilient Young Mothering: Social Inequalities, Late Modernity and the 'Problem' of 'Teenage' Motherhood". Journal of Youth Studies. 8 (1): 59–79. doi:10.1080/13676260500063702. ISSN 1367-6261. S2CID 144485496.
- McDermott, Elizabeth (2006-05-01). "Surviving in Dangerous Places: Lesbian Identity Performances in the Workplace, Social Class and Psychological Health". Feminism & Psychology. 16 (2): 193–211. doi:10.1177/0959-353506062977. ISSN 0959-3535. S2CID 145145743.
- McDermott, Elizabeth (8 April 2016). Queer youth, suicide and self-harm : troubled subjects, troubling norms. Roen, Katrina. Houndmills, Basingstoke, Hampshire. ISBN 978-1-137-00345-4. OCLC 946358035.
