= Beauvoorde Castle =

Belgian castle

Coordinates: 51.016°N 2.655°E

- West Flanders (Belgium)
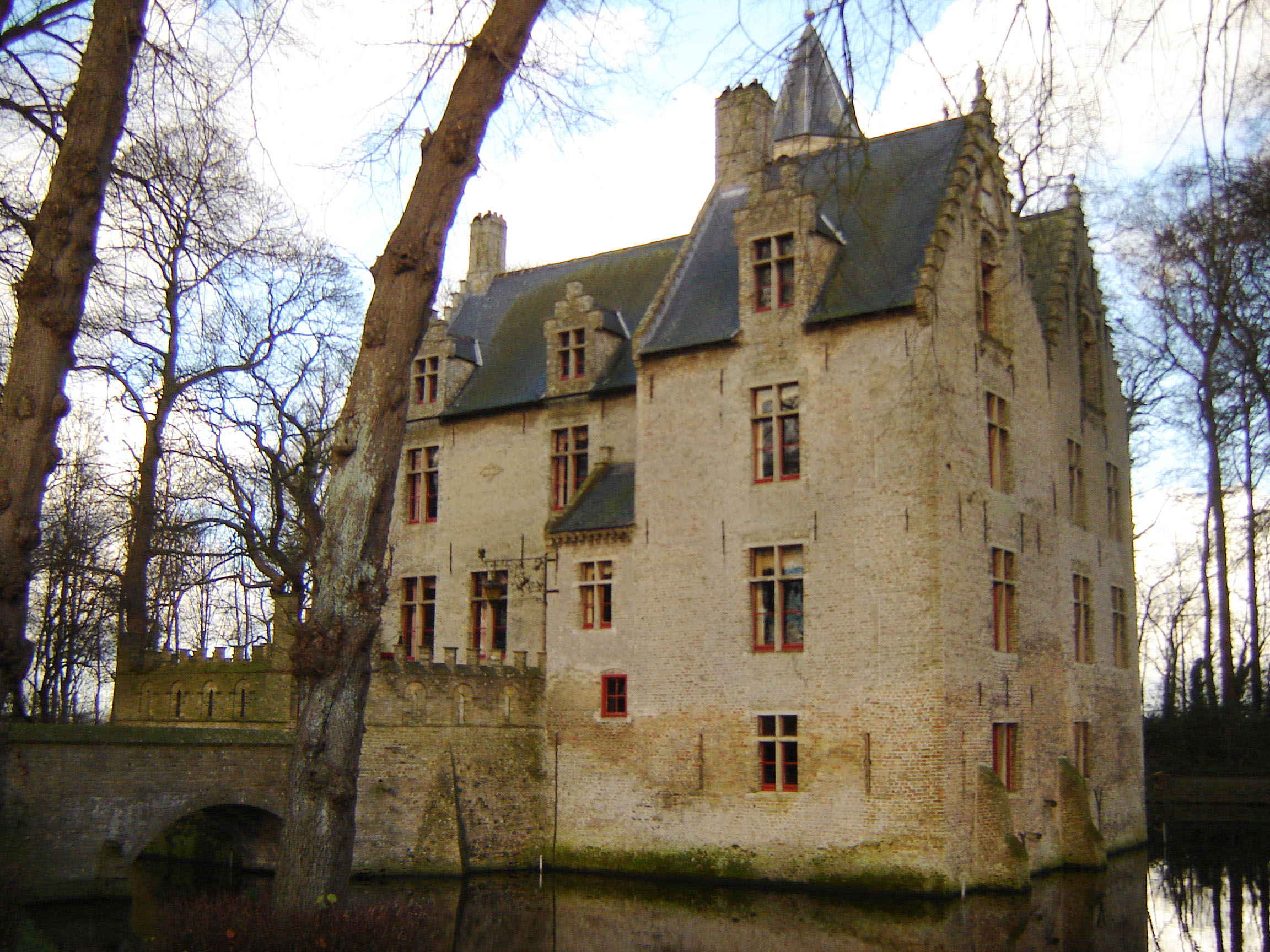
- Kasteel Beauvoorde in December 2006

Site information
- Type: Castle

Beauvoorde Castle (Dutch: Kasteel Beauvoorde) is a castle in Wulveringem, which since 1977 has been part of the municipality of Veurne, West Flanders, Belgium.

The first identified owner of the castle, in 1408, was Jan de Valuwe. In 1584, during the early part of the Eighty Years' War, the castle was burned down by bandits. It was rebuilt in 1617 in the Renaissance style. At that time the castle was owned by Jacob de Bryarde, and it remained in the Bryarde family till 1828, by which time the family fortunes were in decline and the castle was falling into a state of increasing disrepair.

In 1875 a new owner, Arthur Merghelynck, undertook an extensive restoration. The interior fittings and furnishings inside it today date from Merghalynck's time. The building was expanded under plans drawn up by an architect from Veurne called Jozef Vinck. The interior was remodeled in the seventeenth-century style using a combination of recovered and replica elements. The reworking was topped off with a new garden in a Franco-English style.

Merghelynck died childless in 1905 and the castle was bequeathed to the Belgian state on condition they made it available to the (subsequently renamed) Royal Academy of Dutch language and literature (KANTL). Merghelynck's widow died in 1941 at the height of the Second World War, but after the war ended in 1945 his wishes were implemented. The castle was promoted to historic monument status in 1987. In 1998 responsibility for the castle was transferred to a regional level, coming under the remit of the Flemish Heritage foundation.

At certain times the castle can now be visited with the support of an "audio-guide". A "heritage shop" and "visitors' centre" complement the experience. Belgian State transferred the castle domain to the Flemish Community in 2003. Since then, the association Erfgoed Vlaanderen has taken care of its management. In turn, Erfgoed Vlaanderen merged into the new Flemish heritage organization Herita in 2012.

Beauvoorde Castle can now be visited individually with an audio guide. There is also a heritage store and a visitor center. The castle gives a cultural boost to the Westhoek, including through a summer exhibition and other cultural activities.

== See also ==
- List of castles in Belgium
