= Sint-Maria-Latem =

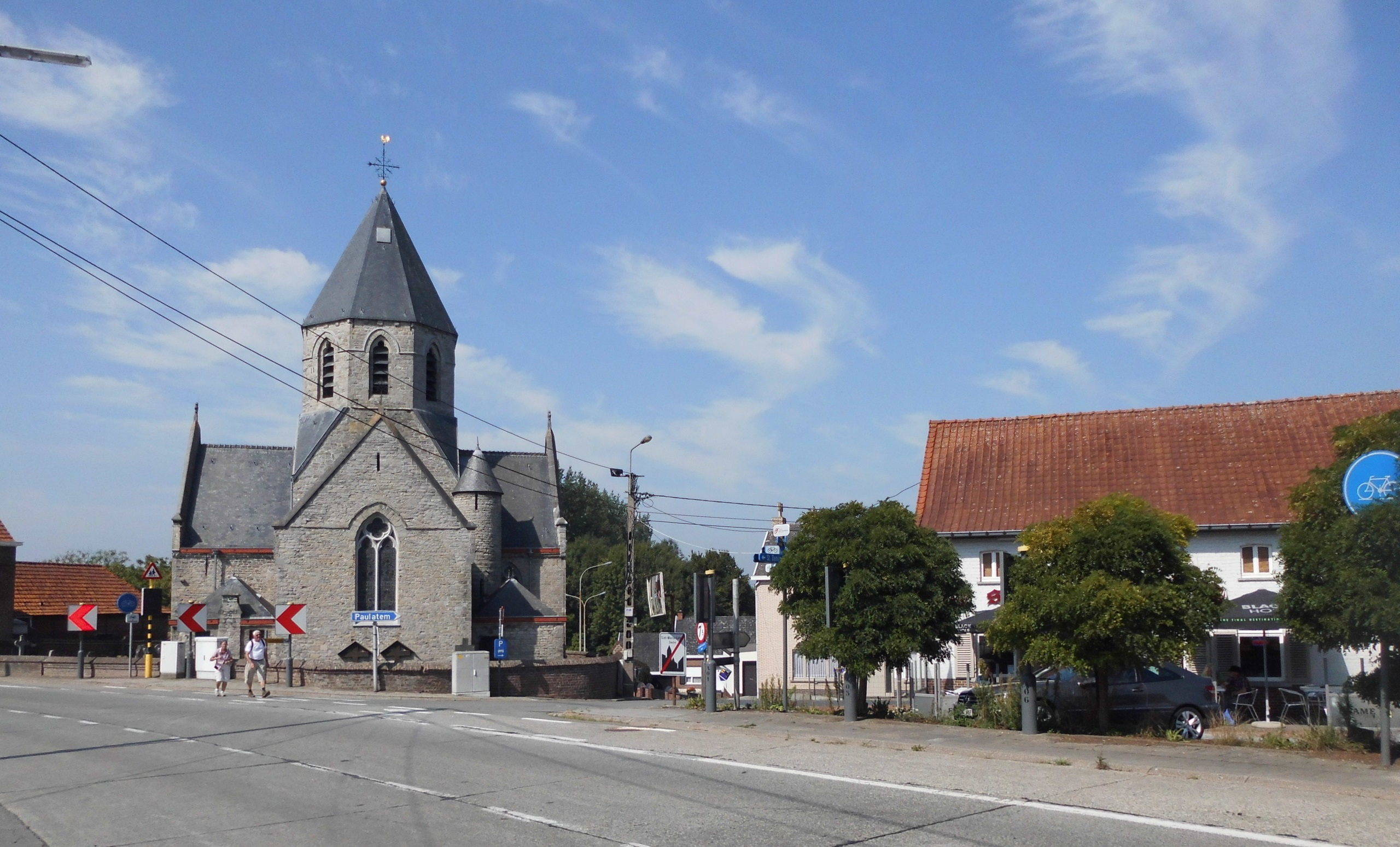
- Sint-Maria-Latem

- Location within Belgium Location within Europe
- Coordinates: 50°53′24″N 03°42′23″E
- Country: Belgium
- Region: Flanders
- Province: East Flanders
- Municipality: Zwalm

Sint-Maria-Latem is a village and a district in the municipality of Zwalm, in East Flanders, Belgium.

The village grew around the Roman road connecting Bavay with Boekhoute. During the Middle Ages, the village was the property of the House of Egmond. The village church is medieval, its oldest parts dating from the 13th century.
