= Roen =

Mountain in Italy

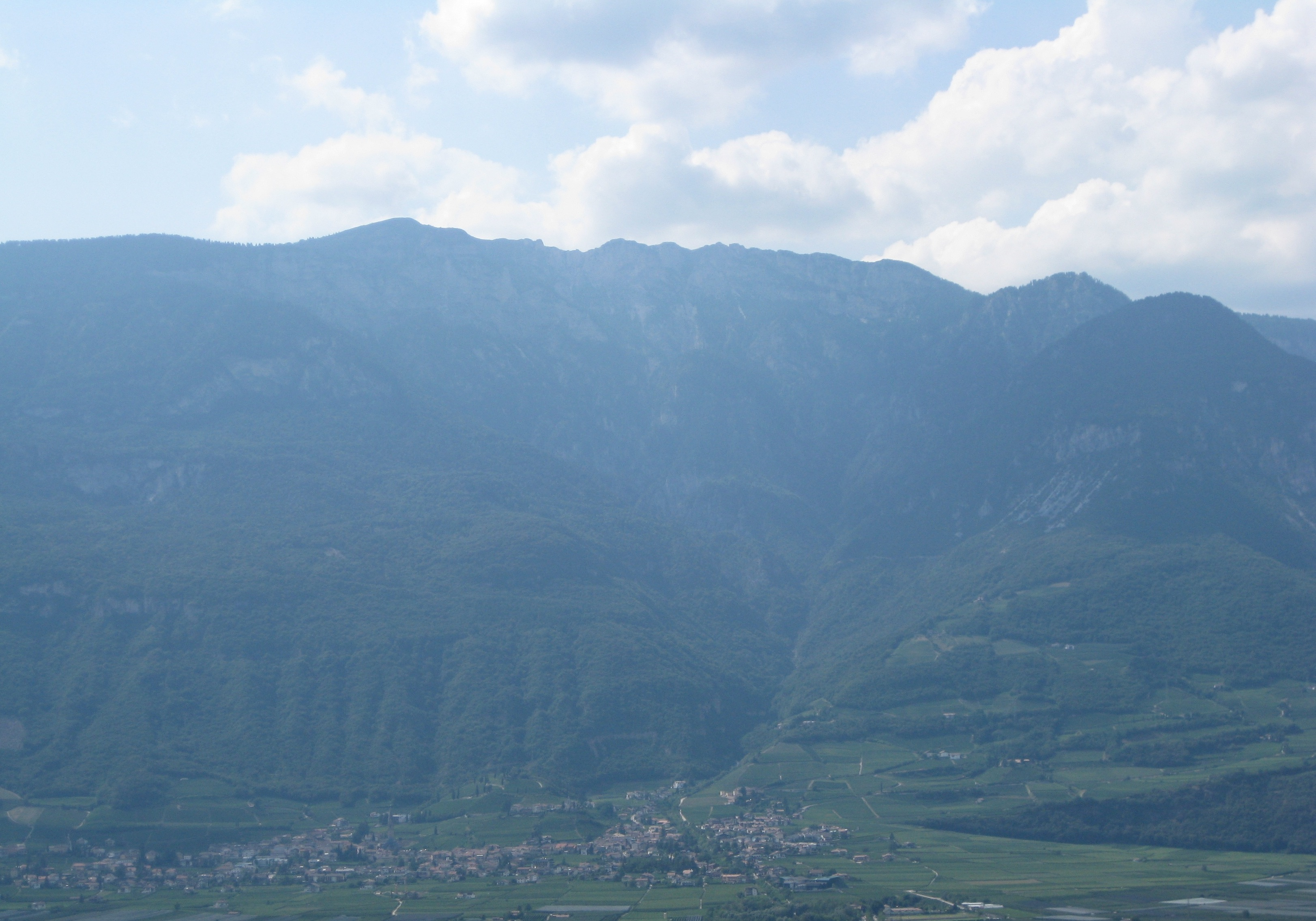

Highest point
- Elevation: 2,116 m (6,942 ft)
- Coordinates: 46°21′36″N 11°11′32″E

Geography
- Location: South Tyrol / Trentino (both Italy)
- Parent range: Nonsberg group

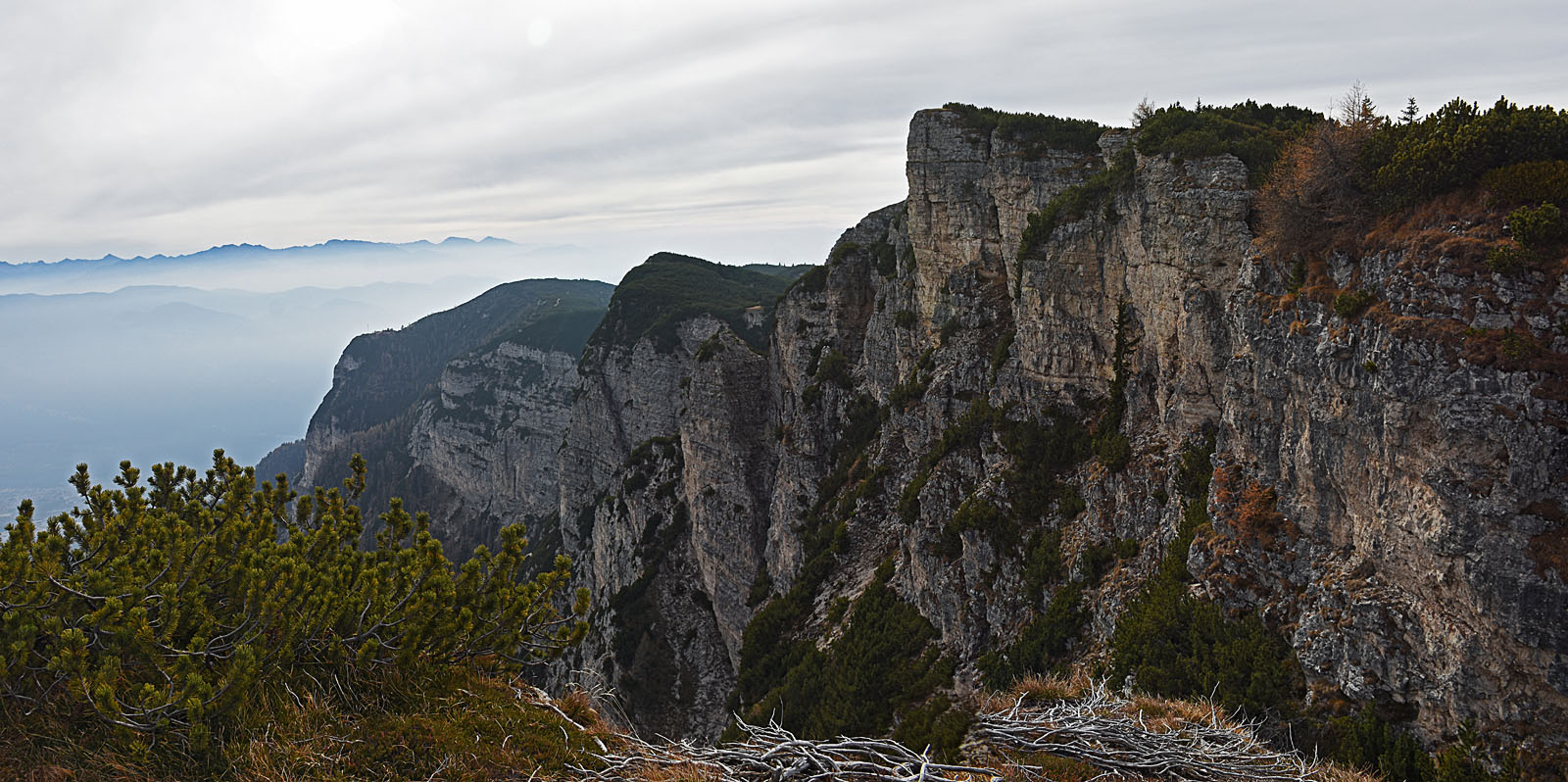
Monte Roen

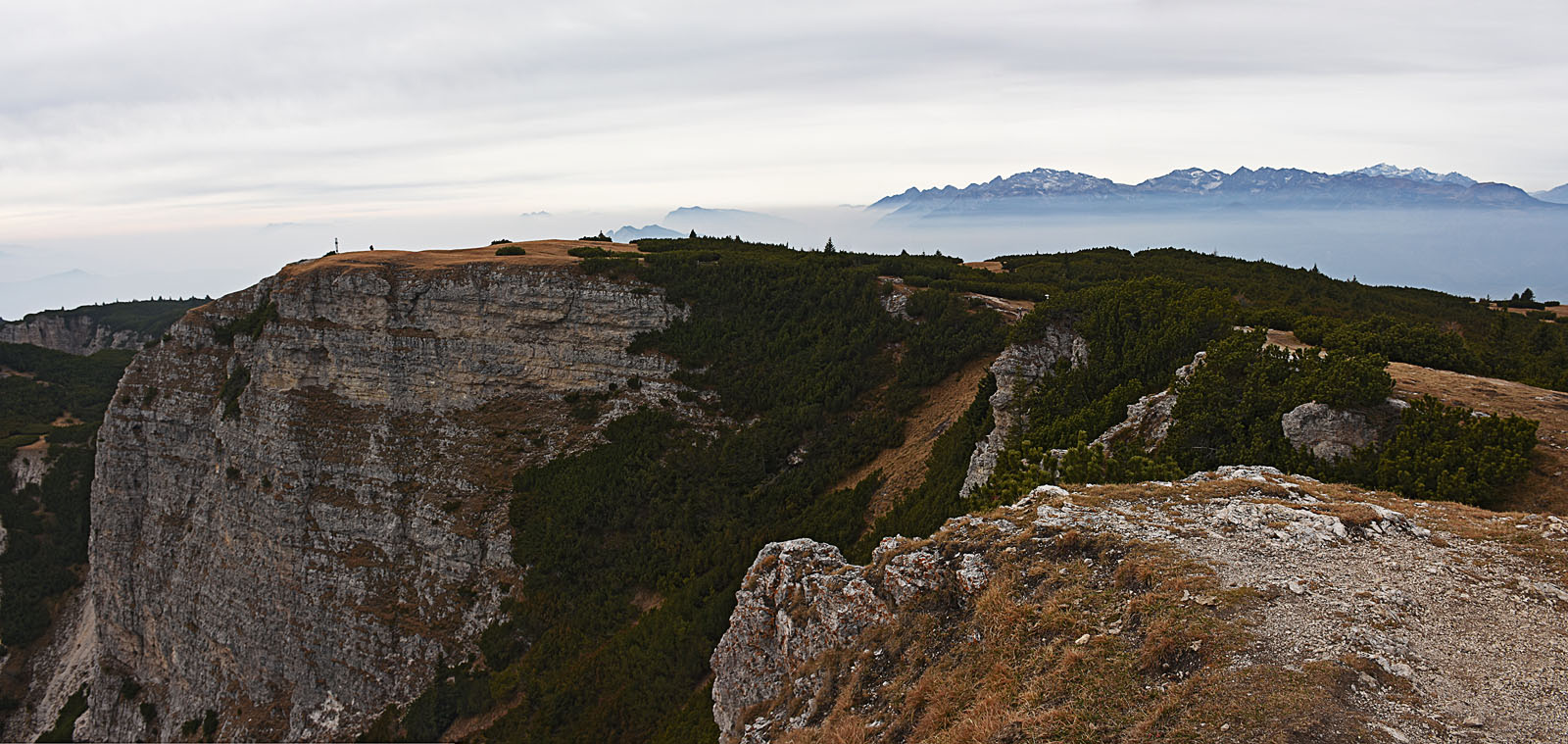
Monte Roen panorama

The Roen (Italian: Monte Roen; German: Roen) is a mountain of the Nonsberg group on the border between South Tyrol and Trentino, Italy.
