= Hofmahdjoch =

Mountain in Italy

- Location within Italy
- Elevation: 1,781 metres (5,843 ft)

Third Approach
- Location: South Tyrol, Italy
- Range: Ortler Alps
- Coordinates: 46°30′21″N 11°02′35″E

The Hofmahdjoch (Italian: Passo Castrin) is a mountain pass in the Ortler Alps in South Tyrol, Italy.

== See also ==
- List of highest paved roads in Europe
- List of mountain passes
