= Developmentalism =

Economic theory

Developmentalism is an economic theory which states that the best way for less developed economies to develop is through fostering a strong and varied internal market and imposing high tariffs on imported goods.

Developmentalism is a cross-disciplinary school of thought that gave way to an ideology of development as the key strategy towards economic prosperity. The school of thought was, in part, a reaction to the United States’ efforts to oppose national independence movements throughout Asia and Africa, which it framed as communist. Developmentalism in the international economic context can be understood as consisting of a set of ideas which converge to place economic development at the center of political endeavors and institutions and also as a means through which to establish legitimacy in the political sphere. Adherents to the theory of developmentalism hold that the sustained economic progress grants legitimate leadership to political figures, especially in developing nations (in Latin America and East Asia) who would otherwise not have the benefit of a unanimous social consensus for their leadership or their international policy with regard to industrialized countries. Developmentalists believe that national autonomy for "Third World" countries can be achieved and maintained through the utilization of external resources by those countries in a capitalist system. To those professed ends, developmentalism was the paradigm used in an attempt to reverse the negative impact that the international economy was having on developing countries in the 1950s–60s, at the time during which Latin American countries had begun to implement import substitution strategies. Using this theory, economic development was framed by modern-day Western criteria: economic success is gauged in terms of capitalistic notions of what it means for a country to become developed, autonomous, and legitimate.

The theory is based on the assumption that not only are there similar stages to development for all countries but also that there is a linear movement from one stage to another that goes from traditional or primitive to modern or industrialized.

Though initially the preserve of emerging economies in the Asia Pacific area, Latin America and Africa, the notion of developmentalism has resurfaced more recently in the developed world – notably in the economic planks of 'unorthodox' policy makers such as Donald Trump and Bernie Sanders in the United States.

== Ideology and basic tenets ==
There are four main ideas that are integrated behind the theory of developmentalism:

- First, there is the notion that the performance of a nation's economy is the central source of legitimacy that a regime may claim. Rather than subscribing to the notion, for example, that the ability to make and enforce laws gives a state power, developmentalists argue that the sustenance of economic growth and the subsequent promotion of citizens' welfare gives the general population incentive to support the regime in power, granting it both de facto and de jure legitimacy.
- The second tenet of developmentalism asserts that it is the role of regimes to use their governmental authority to spread out the risks associated with capitalist development, as well as to combine governmental and entrepreneurial wills in order to maximize the advancement of national interest.
- Thirdly, developmentalism asserts that state bureaucrats become separated from politicians, which allows for the independent and successful redevelopments of leadership structures and administrative and bureaucratic procedures (when such changes become necessary). This separation is key to balancing the needs of the state and the importance of forming and maintaining strong international economic ties. The government, then, has the autonomy to deal with certain issues on a national level, while helping state bureaucrats maintain the internationalism necessary to develop the nation's economy.
- The final aspect of developmentalism's ideology deals with the idea that it is necessary for nations to utilize the capitalist system as a means of advancement in the international economy. Privileged positions in capitalist systems arise from active responses to external affairs in order to obtain the external resources with which to gain larger amounts of economic autonomy. The resources gained from active participation in international economic affairs help propel countries out of being exploited by capitalism to positions from which they can exploit the international economy for its own national gain.

== History ==
Tony Smith writes in his article Requiem or New Agenda for Third World Studies? about how developmentalism gained its footing in international affairs in the years immediately following World War II, during which the United States assumed leadership of a world that had been devastated by the war, while the United States was all but physically unscathed. The end of Second World War catalyzed massive national liberation movements throughout Africa and Asia: these movements were a threat to the United States, in its fear that communism would take root in newly established independent nations. Therefore, these movements towards liberation became a top priority of the United States: developmentalism fit what the United States wanted very well, because its tenets create an environment of both national autonomy and widespread participation in the international economy. This participation would be in the capitalist form, so in promoting developmentalism, the United States was also promoting capitalism in newly independent nations. The school of developmentalist thought thrived on this sudden spike in support from the United States. Further, the school came to unite scholars from different social scientific disciplines under the umbrella of social ties and perceived common interest in the suppression of communism and gaining increasing influence on the politico-economic stage of the world.

The ensuing 'Golden Age' of the developmentalist school began after 1945 and extended into the late 1960s. During the 1970s, however, the popularity and prevalence of developmentalism flickered and decreased.

During the 1950s and 1960s, developmentalism in practice did much to promote prosperity in the Southern Cone (comprising parts of Brazil, Argentina, and Uruguay) and the Andean country of Chile. As noted by Naomi Klein, “[d]uring this dizzying period of expansion, the Southern Cone began to look more like Europe and North America than the rest of Latin America or other parts of the Third World.” Workers in new factories formed strong unions that negotiated middle-class salaries, and their children were sent off to study at newly constructed public universities. By the Fifties, Argentina had the largest middle class in South America, while Uruguay had a literacy rate of 95% and provided free health care to all its citizens.

== Goals ==
Developmentalism attempts to codify the ways in which development is discussed on an international level. Through developmentalism, it is thought by its advocates that discussions about the economic development of the 'Third World' can be redesigned in such a way that everyone will use the same vocabulary to discuss the various phenomena of development. This way, societies can be discussed comparatively without the impediments associated with placing developmental disparities across nations in completely different categories of speech and thought. This increased uniformity of language would increase understanding and appreciation for the studies about development from different fields in the social sciences and allow freer and more productive communication about these studies. Before its decline in the 1970s, scholars had been optimistic that developmentalism could break down the barriers between the disciplines of social sciences when discussing the complexities of development. This school of thought produced such works as Talcott Parsons and Edward Shils's Toward A General Theory of Action; Clifford Geertz's Old Societies and New States; and Donald L.M. Blackmer and Max F. Millikan's The Emerging Nations.

== Decline ==
The model of developmentalism proved to have two major reasons for decline within the school:

- The model created a system that was too formal and structured, providing an ethnocentric and unilateral method for changing the third world.
  - In this, developmentalists created plans for development that were mostly inflexible, as they relied heavily on the Western model of development as their primus modus. Western development, supposedly, held the keys to unlocking the door to the Global South’s development, and as such, could shed light on the changes that were occurring there. In doing so, however, the histories of the South were reduced into terms that could be applied to a model of development. This resulted in extremely rigid models in which labeled deviations from the conventional "traditional" (undeveloped) or "modern" (developed) society as dysfunctional, and to draw clear empirical distinctions between traditional and modern societies
- A lack of cohesion within the models and the academic community itself.
  - Developmentalist models attempted to create a universal system of development, and as such, resulted in methods that were too loose and incoherent to provide an accurate picture of the circumstances under which development could work in the Third World. Because of the vast amounts of difference in the cultures of the Global South, creating generalizations in which one theory of development was applicable to all settings became extremely difficult. Additionally, disagreement within the academic community itself and the lack of an obvious leader did not allow for internal cooperation. Many developmentalist scholars became disenchanted with the way in which the United States foreign policy was being implemented, especially during the Vietnam War and the Alliance for Progress. Intentions, as well, were not always non-partisan; many scholars had intended their writing to be policy-relevant in the spread of capitalism and an elite brand of democracy in the South, as well as in the struggle to block the spread of communism.

These problems eventually marked the decline of school of developmentalist theory in the late 1970s. Some scholars (such as Samuel Huntington and Jorge Domínguez) contend that this rise and fall is a predictable phenomenon that typifies the introduction of any theoretical paradigm to the trial phase: a surge in popularity is likely with such theories, followed by various stages of pausing and surging in their prevalence in international economies and politics. It is also a possibility that the failures of developmentalism in the 1970s resulted from a realization that, after twenty-five years, 'Third World' countries were still in the 'Third World,' despite efforts towards economic gain characterized by developmentalism. This view is elaborated on by Gabriel Almond, who asserts that the increasing number of developing countries that had turned to authoritarian regimes negated the optimism with which developmentalism had been embraced. The US policies, which incorporated the tenets of developmentalism, were, in the 1970s, increasingly being seen as harmful to the Third World in imperialistic ways, and thus the school entered into crisis.

== Partial revival in the developed world ==
In the wake of the 2008–2012 Great Recession, the notion of developmentalism has somehow started to resurface, this time amongst "populist" politicians in the developed world, in association with some degree of mercantilism. In that perspective, the 'under-developed' jurisdictions that need to be protected and stimulated are no longer in the Southern Hemisphere but in the developed world itself, where pauperized states/regions such as Pennsylvania and the Great Lakes in the United States or parts of Northern France and Northern England are now suffering from the same kind of socioeconomic difficulties once found mostly in the Third World.

This unconventional use of the term is used to justify some degree of protectionism and industrial dirigisme e.g. in the context of Trumponomics in the United States:

"That [ideological] bravado endeared Donald Trump to millions of disenfranchised lower-middle-class voters across the Rust Belt and proved instrumental to his electoral victory in the fall [...] [He promised] to create 'millions of jobs' in America in the coming quarters. Not coincidentally, when it comes to investment destination, the president seems to have a preference for Pennsylvania, Upstate New York, Michigan, Wisconsin and Indiana: a new kind of capital stewardship for the era of self-seeking capitalism..."

== Examples ==
- Bretton-Woods (1944)
- International Development Association (1960)
- Truman’s Point Four (1949)
- Development Assistance Committee (DAC) of OECD (1961)
- SUNFED (1958)
- UNDP (1965)

These policies shifted focus from reconstruction to development to poverty reduction, created a demand for global development intervention and shift from exploitation to development U.S. aid programme, and created norms and statistics for international donors.

== Criticism ==
The implementation of developmentalist ideologies has been critiqued in multiple lights, both by the right and by the left.

Developmentalism is often accused by the left (though not only by the left) of having an ideology of neocolonialism at its root. Developmentalist strategies use a Eurocentric viewpoint of development, a viewpoint that often goes hand in hand with the implication that non-European societies are underdeveloped. As such, it gives way for the perpetuation of Western dominance over such underdeveloped nations, in a neocolonialist fashion. Developed nations such as the United States have been accused of seizing opportunities of disaster for their own benefit in what is known as disaster capitalism. Disaster capitalism, a term used by Naomi Klein, describes the process in which situations of financial crisis are used in order to force an emergency opening of the free market in order to regain economic stability. This happened in the examples of Argentina, Chile, Bolivia, and post-Katrina New Orleans, among others. Developmentalist ideas also portray the Western ideal of development and democracy as an evolutionary course of history. In Eric Wolf’s book, Europe and the People without History, Wolf shows, through a long history of examples, that the Western world is only one of many visions of the world, and to view it as the pinnacle of a linear world evolutionary chain would be inaccurate. Developmentalist strategies often implicate that history is on a unilateral path of evolution towards development, and that cultural derivations have little implication in the final product.

From the right, critics say that developmentalist strategies deny the free market its autonomy. By creating a state controlled market economy, it takes away the organic nature in which a market is meant to be created. They argue that developmentalist strategies have not generally worked in the past, leaving many countries, in fact, worse off than they were before they began state-controlled development. This is due to a lack of freedom in the free market and its constrictive nature. In turn, it is argued, reactive totalitarian forces take hold of the government in response to Western intervention, such as Chávez's Venezuela and Ortega’s Nicaragua, creating even more complex problems for the Western vision of development.

Socio-anthropologists criticize the developmentalism as a form of social change implemented by an exogenous party. This creates what is called the developmentalist configuration.

== See also ==
- Arthur Lewis
- Beijing Consensus
- Development economics
- Market intervention
- Neomercantilism
- Protectionism
- Structuralist economics
