= Julie Yorn =

American film producer

- Born: Julie Silverman; 1967 (age 58–59)
- Education: B.A. Tulane University
- Occupation: Movie producer
- Known for: co-president of production at Sidney Kimmel Entertainment
- Spouse: Kevin Yorn
- Parent(s): Sydel Finfer Silverman Wolf; Mel Silverman
- Family: Eric R. Wolf (stepfather); Pete Yorn (brother-in-law)

Julie Yorn (born 1967) is an American film producer.

== Biography ==
Yorn was born Julie Silverman and raised in a Jewish family, the daughter of Dr. Sydel Finfer Silverman Wolf and Mel Silverman. Her father was an artist and her mother was the president of the Wenner-Gren Foundation for Anthropological Research in New York. Her stepfather, Dr. Eric R. Wolf, is a distinguished professor emeritus of anthropology at Lehman College and the Graduate Center of the City University of New York. She graduated from Tulane University and then went on to work as a senior vice president at the Los Angeles–based, talent-management and film-production company Addis-Wechsler & Associates. In 2009, she quit the Firm to sign a first look deal with 20th Century Fox.

She is best known for producing the critically acclaimed film Hell or High Water (2016) that earned her an Academy Award for Best Picture nomination with Carla Hacken. She is president of production at Sidney Kimmel Entertainment.

== Awards and nominations ==
- Nominated: Academy Award for Best Picture - Hell or High Water
- Won: Primetime Emmy Award for Outstanding Documentary or Nonfiction Series - Mr. Scorsese

== Personal life ==
In 1996, she married attorney Kevin Yorn in a Jewish ceremony in Tarrytown, New York. They later divorced in 2005.
