= Hidden Frontier =

Hidden Frontier may refer to:

- The Hidden Frontier, a 1974 ethnographic study
- Star Trek: Hidden Frontier, Star Trek fan film project
