= History of the Alps =

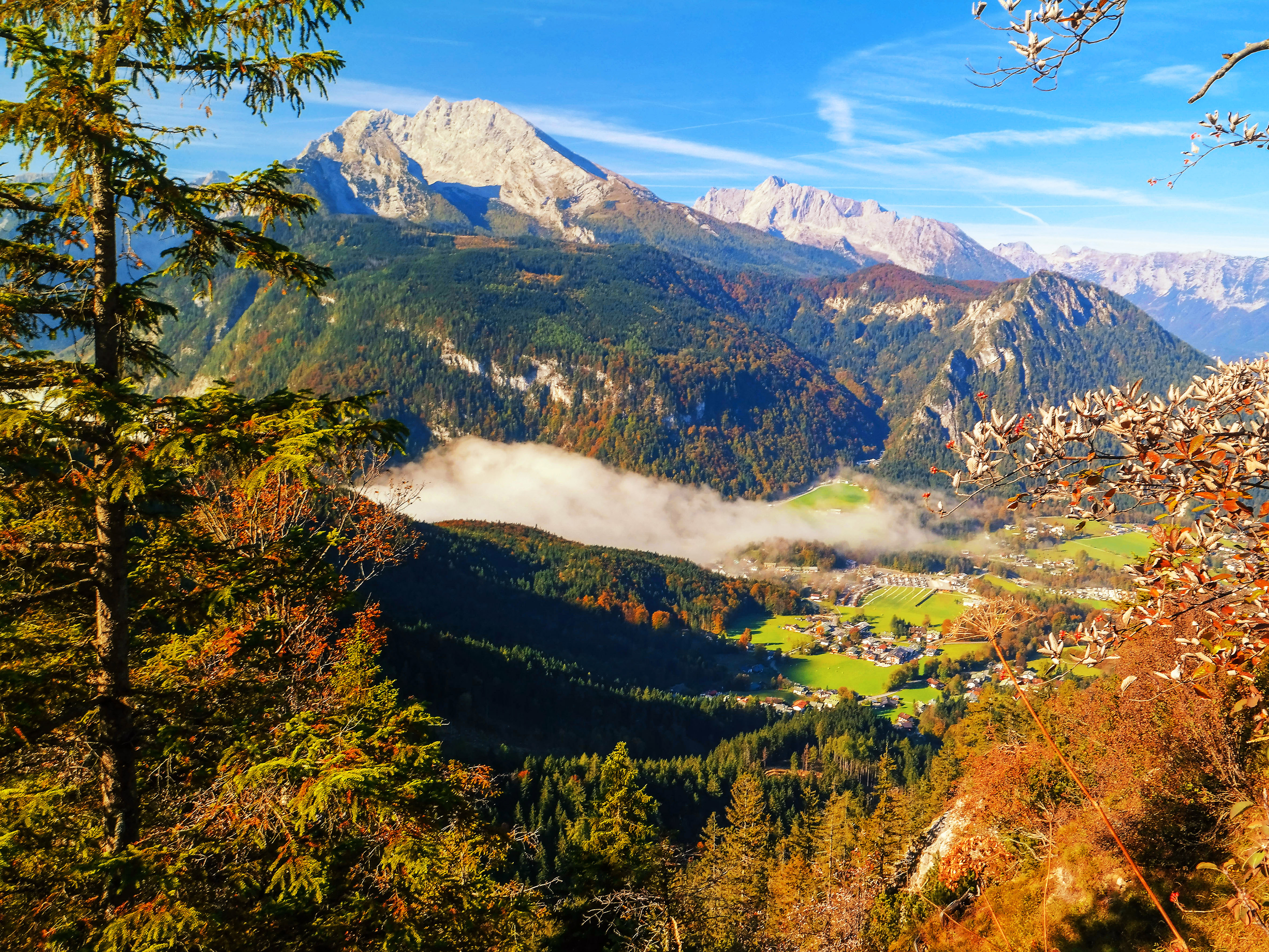
Berchtesgaden National Park in Bavaria

The valleys of the Alps have been inhabited since prehistoric times. The Alpine culture, which developed there, centers on transhumance.

Currently the Alps are divided among eight countries: France, Monaco, Italy, Switzerland, Liechtenstein, Austria, Germany and Slovenia. In 1991 the Alpine Convention was established to regulate this transnational area, whose area measures about 190,000 square kilometres (73,000 sq mi).

== Early history (before 1200) ==
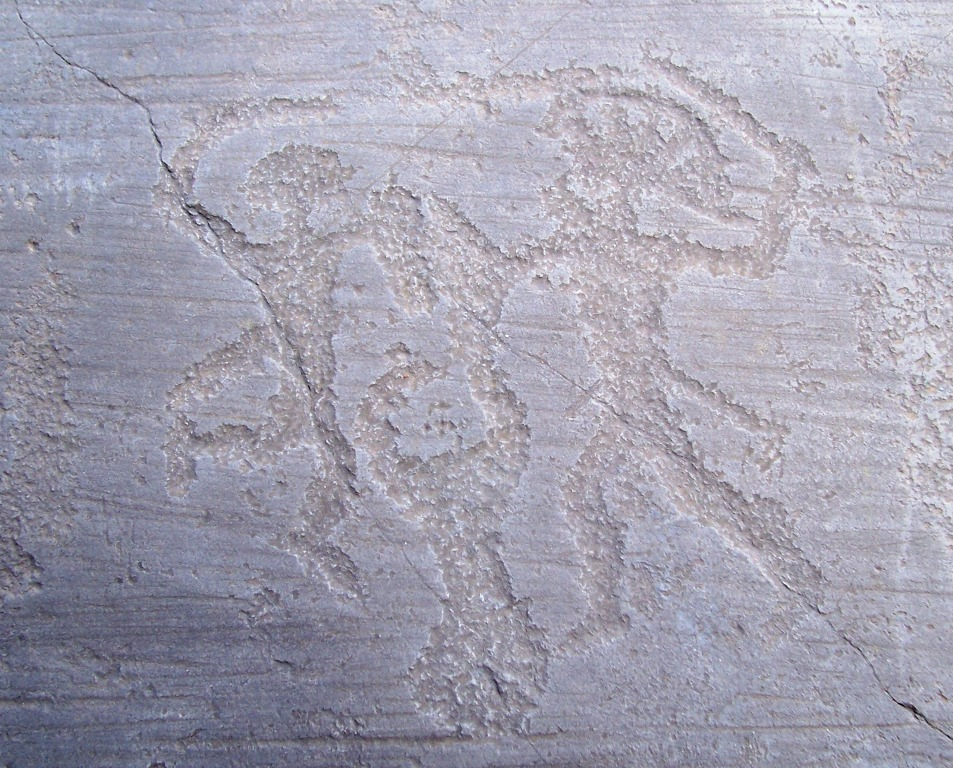
Petroglyphs, Rock Drawings in Valcamonica, Italy, which was recognized by UNESCO in 1979 and was Italy's first recognized World Heritage Site

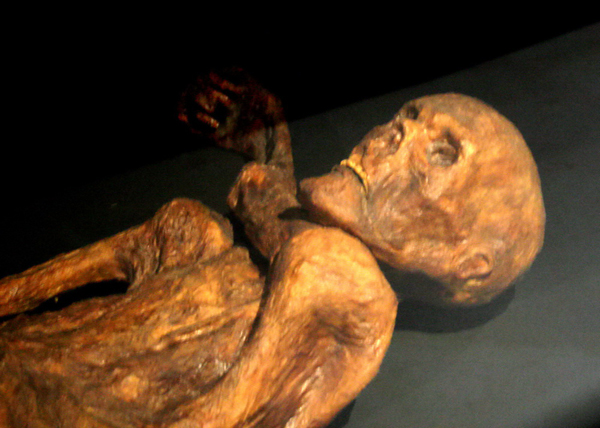
Reconstruction of Ötzi mummy as shown in Alpes-de-Haute-Provence, France. The original mummy and his remains and personal belongings are on exhibit at the South Tyrol Museum of Archaeology in Bolzano, South Tyrol, Italy.

The Wildkirchli caves in the Appenzell Alps show traces of Neanderthal habitation (about 40,000 BCE). During the Würm glaciation (up to c. 11700 BP), the entire Alps were covered in ice. Anatomically modern humans reach the Alpine region by c. 30,000 years ago. MtDNA Haplogroup K (believed to have originated in the mid-Upper Paleolithic, between about 30,000 and 22,000 years ago, with an estimated age here of c. 12,000 years BP), is a genetic marker associated with southeastern Alpine region.

Traces of transhumance appear in the Neolithic. In the Bronze Age, the Alps formed the boundary of the Urnfield and Terramare cultures. The mummy found on the Ötztal Alps, known as "Ötzi the Iceman", lived c. 3200 BC. At that stage the population in its majority had already changed from an economy based on hunting and gathering to one based on agriculture and animal husbandry. It is still an open question whether forms of pastoral mobility, such as transhumance (alpiculture), already existed in prehistory.

The earliest historical accounts date to the Roman period, mostly due to Greco-Roman ethnography, with some epigraphic evidence due to the Raetians, Lepontii and Gauls, with Ligurians and Venetii occupying the fringes in the south-west and south-east, respectively (Cisalpine Gaul) during the 4th and 3rd centuries BC. The Rock Drawings in Valcamonica date to this period. A few details have come down to modern scholars of the conquest of many of the Alpine tribes by Augustus, as well as Hannibal's battles across the Alps. Most of the local Gallic tribes allied themselves with the Carthaginians in the Second Punic War, for the duration of which Rome lost control over most of Northern Italy. The Roman conquest of Italy was only complete after the Roman victory over Carthage, by the 190s BC.

Between 35 and 6 BC, the Alpine region was gradually integrated into the expanding Roman Empire. The contemporary monument Tropaeum Alpium in La Turbie celebrates the victory won by the Romans over 46 tribes in these mountains. The subsequent construction of roads over the Alpine passes first permitted southern and northern Roman settlements in the Alps to be connected, and eventually integrated the inhabitants of the Alps into the culture of the Empire. The upper Rhône Valley or Vallis Poenina fell to the Romans after a battle at Octodurus (Martigny) in 57 BC. Aosta was founded in 25 BC as Augusta Praetoria Salassorum in the former territory of the Salassi. Raetia was conquered in 15 BC.

With the division of the Roman Empire and the collapse of its Western part in the fourth and fifth centuries, power relations in the Alpine region reverted to their local dimensions. Often dioceses became important centres. While in Italy and Southern France, dioceses in the Western Alps were established early (beginning in the fourth century) and resulted in numerous small sees, in the Eastern Alps such foundations continued into the thirteenth century and the dioceses were usually larger. New monasteries in the mountain valleys also promoted the Christianisation of the population. In that period the core area of supra-regional political powers was mainly situated north of the Alps, first in the Carolingian Empire and later, after its division, in France and the Holy Roman Empire. The German emperors, who received the imperial investiture from the Pope in Rome between the ninth and the fifteenth centuries, had to cross the Alps along with their entourages.

In the 7th century, much of the Eastern Alps were settled by Slavs. Between the 7th and 9th century, the Slavic principality of Carantania existed as one of the few non-Germanic polities in the Alps. The Alpine Slavs, who inhabited the majority of present-day Austria and Slovenia, were gradually Germanized from the 9th to the 14th century. The modern Slovenes are their southernmost descendants.

The successive emigration and occupation of the Alpine region by the Alemanni from the 6th to the 8th centuries are, too, known only in outline. For "mainstream" history, the Frankish and later the Habsburg empire, the Alps had strategic importance as an obstacle, not as a landscape, and the Alpine passes have consequently had great significance militarily.

Between 889 and 973, a community of Muslim raiders operating from their base of Fraxinetum, on the coast of Provence, blocked the Alpine passes to Christian travellers until their expulsion by Christian forces led by Arduin Glaber in 973, at which point transalpine trade was able to resume.

Not until the final breakup of the Carolingian Empire in the 10th and 11th centuries is it possible to trace out the local history of different parts of the Alps, notably with the High Medieval Walser migrations.

== Later Medieval to Early Modern Era (1200 to 1900) ==
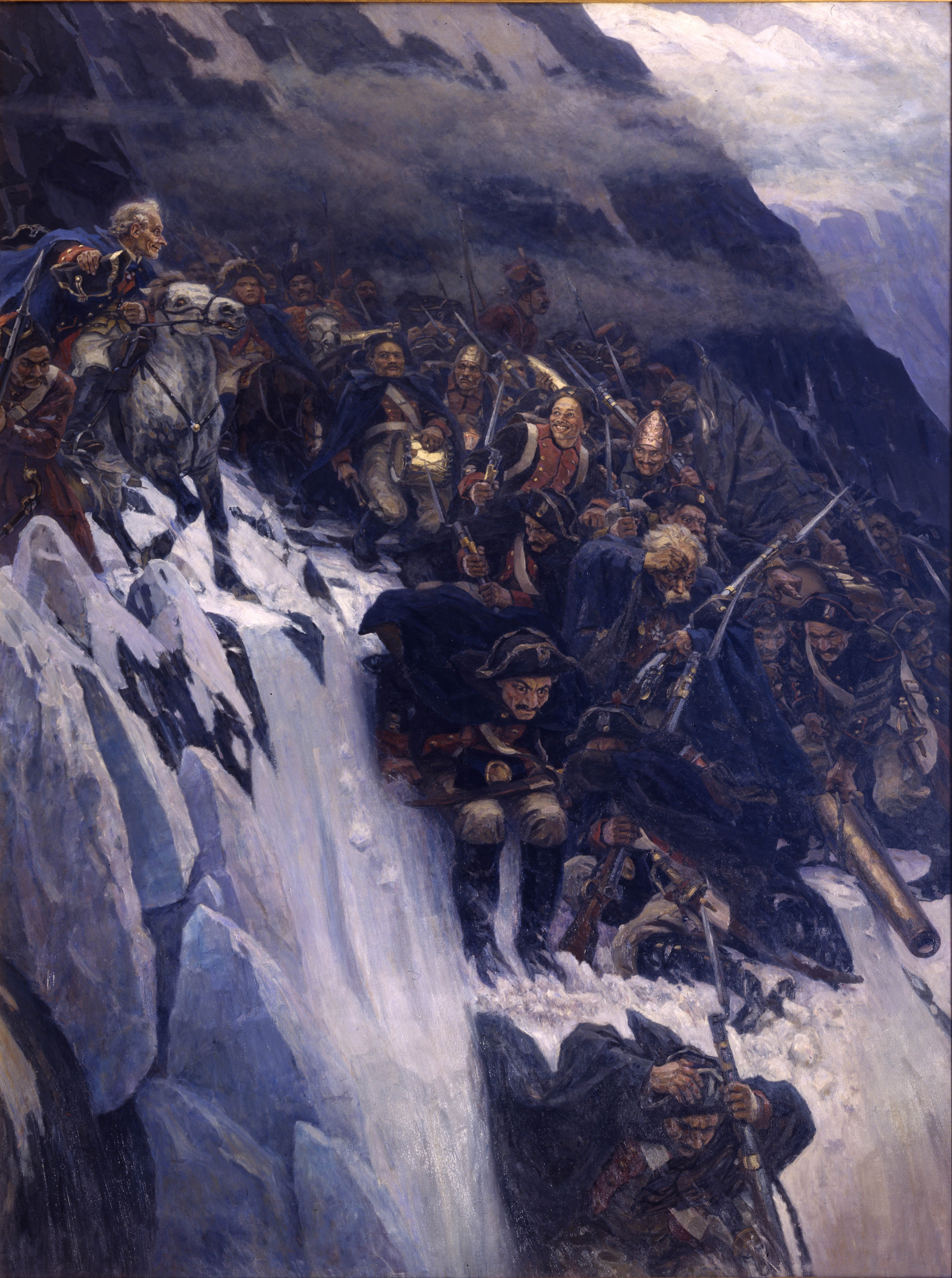
Suvorov crossing the Alps, by Vasily Surikov

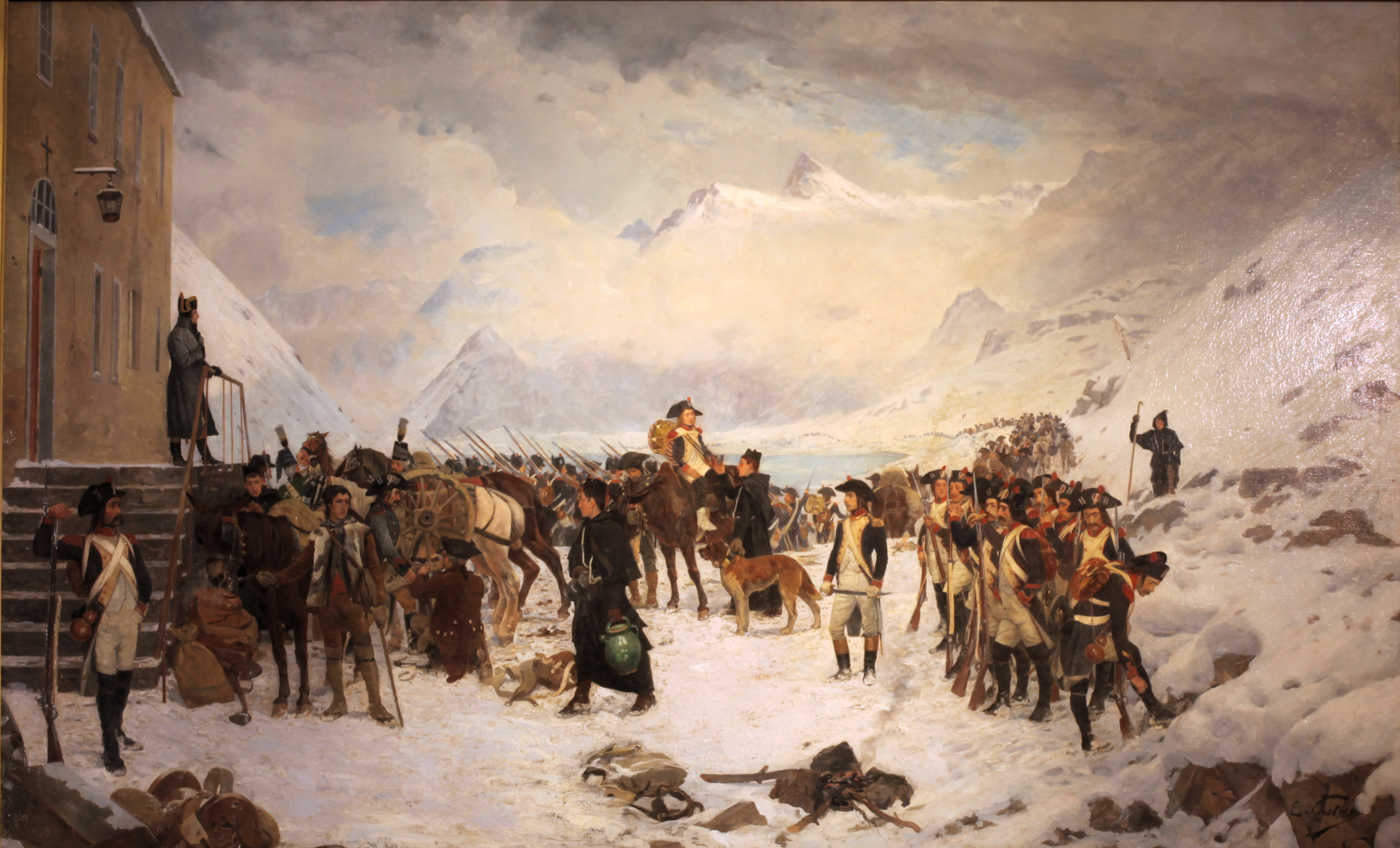
Napoleon passing the Great St Bernard Pass, by Edouard Castres

The French historian Fernand Braudel, in his famous volume on Mediterranean civilisation, describes the Alps as "an exceptional range of mountains from the point of view of resources, collective disciplines, the quality of its human population and the number of good roads." This remarkable human presence in the Alpine region came into being with the population growth and agrarian expansion of the High Middle Ages. At first a mixed form of agriculture and animal husbandry dominated the economy. Then, from the Late Middle Ages onwards, cattle tended to replace sheep as the dominant animals. In a few regions of the northern slope of the Alps, cattle farming became increasingly oriented toward long-range markets and substituted agriculture completely. At the same time other types of interregional and transalpine exchange were growing in significance. The most important pass was the Brenner, which could accommodate cart traffic beginning in the fifteenth century. In the Western and Central Alps, the passes were practicable only by pack animals up to the period around 1800.

The process of state formation in the Alps was driven by the proximity to focal areas of European conflicts such as in the Italian wars of 1494–1559. In that period the socio-political structures of Alpine regions drifted apart. One can identify three different developmental models: one of princely centralization (Western Alps), a local-communal one (Switzerland) and an intermediate one, characterised by a powerful nobility (Eastern Alps).

Until the late nineteenth century many Alpine valleys remained mainly shaped by agrarian and pastoral activities. Population growth favoured the intensification of land use and the spread of corn, potato and cheese production. The shorter growing season at higher altitudes did not seem to be an impediment until around 1700. Later, however, it became a major obstacle to the further intensification of agriculture, especially in comparison to the surrounding lowlands where land productivity increased rapidly. Inside the Alpine region there was a striking difference between the western and central parts, which were dominated by small farming establishments, and the eastern part, which were characterised by medium or big farms. Migration to the urbanised zones of the surrounding areas was already apparent before 1500 and was often temporary. In the Alps themselves, urbanisation was slow.

=== Central Alps ===
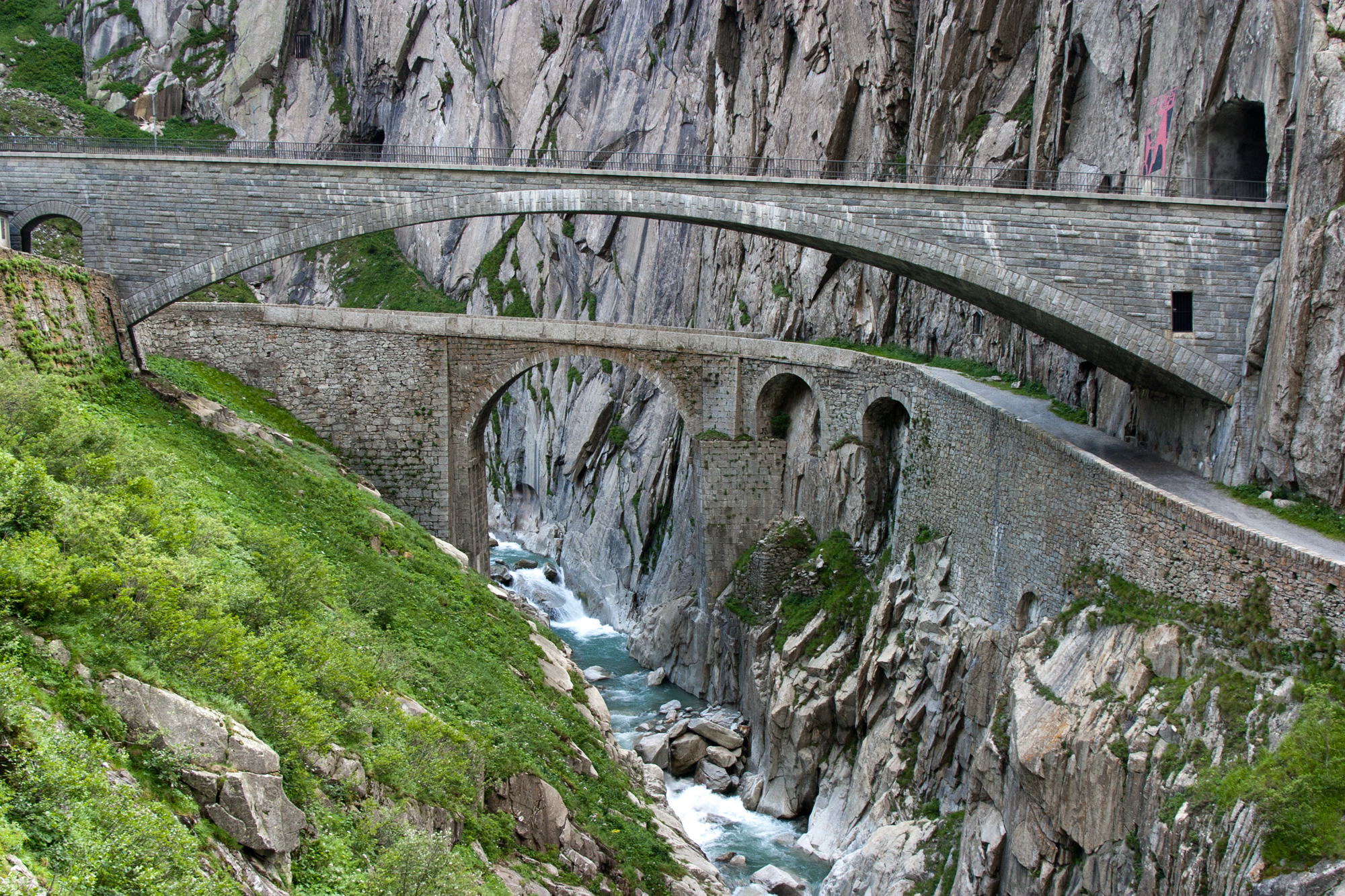
Teufelsbrücke (Devil's Bridge) on the route to the Gotthard Pass; the currently used bridge from 1958 over the first drivable bridge from 1830

In the Central Alps the chief event, on the northern side of the chain, is the gradual formation from 1291 to 1516 of the Swiss Confederacy, at least so far as regards the mountain cantons, and with especial reference to the independent confederations of the Grisons and the Valais, which only became full members of the Confederation in 1803 and 1815 respectively. The attraction of the south was too strong for both the Forest Cantons and the Grisons, so that both tried to secure, and actually did secure, various bits of the Milanese.

The Gotthard Pass was known in antiquity as Adula Mons, but it was not one of the important Alpine passes due to the impassability of the Schöllenen Gorge north of the pass. This changed dramatically with the construction of the so-called Devil's Bridge by the year 1230. Almost immediately, in 1231, the formerly unimportant valley of Uri was granted imperial immediacy and became the main route connecting Germany and Italy. Also in 1230, a hospice dedicated to Gotthard of Hildesheim was built on the pass to accommodate the pilgrims to Rome which now took this route. The sudden strategical importance for the European powers gained by what is now Central Switzerland was an important factor in the formation of the Old Swiss Confederacy beginning in the late 13th century.

In the 15th century, the Forest Cantons won the Valle Leventina as well as Bellinzona and the Valle di Blenio (though the Valle d'Ossola was held for a time only). Blenio was added to the Val Bregaglia (which had been given to the bishop of Coire in 960 by the emperor Otto I), along with the valleys of Valle Mesolcina and of Val Poschiavo.

=== Western Alps ===
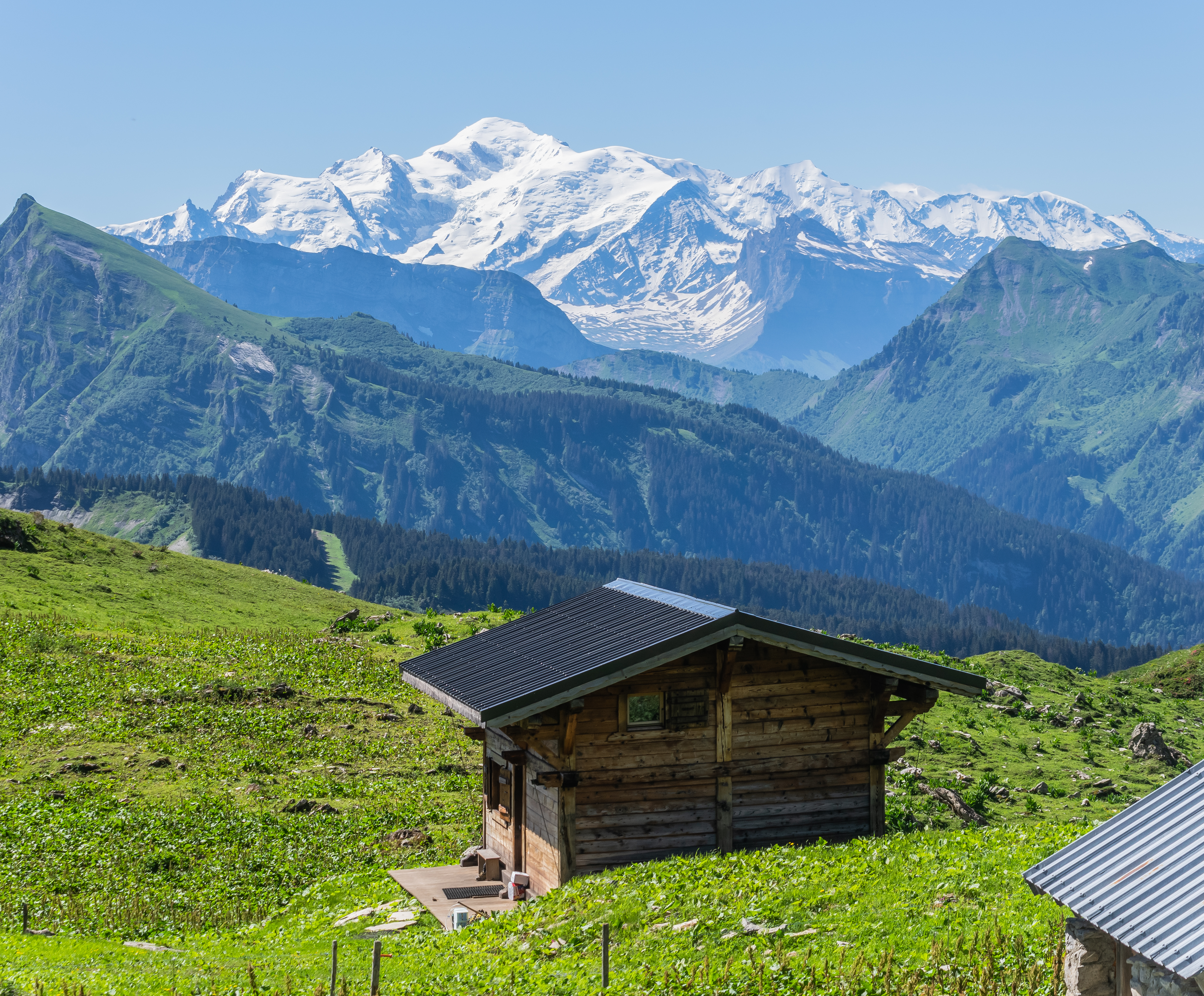
Mont Blanc massif

In the case of the Western Alps (excluding the part from the chain of Mont Blanc to the Simplon Pass, which followed the fortunes of the Valais), a prolonged struggle for control took place between the feudal lords of Savoy, the Dauphiné and Provence. In 1349 the Dauphiné fell to France, while in 1388 the county of Nice passed from Provence to the house of Savoy, which also then held Piedmont as well as other lands on the Italian side of the Alps. The struggle henceforth was limited to France and the house of Savoy, but little by little France succeeded in pushing back the house of Savoy across the Alps, forcing it to become a purely Italian power.

One turning-point in the rivalry was the Treaty of Utrecht (1713), by which France ceded to Savoy the Alpine districts of Exilles, Bardonnèche (Bardonecchia), Oulx, Fenestrelles, and Châtean Dauphin, while Savoy handed over to France the valley of Barcelonnette, situated on the western slope of the Alps and forming part of the county of Nice. The final act in this long-continued struggle took place in 1860, when France obtained by cession the rest of the county of Nice and also Savoy, thus remaining sole ruler on the western slope of the Alps.

=== Eastern Alps ===
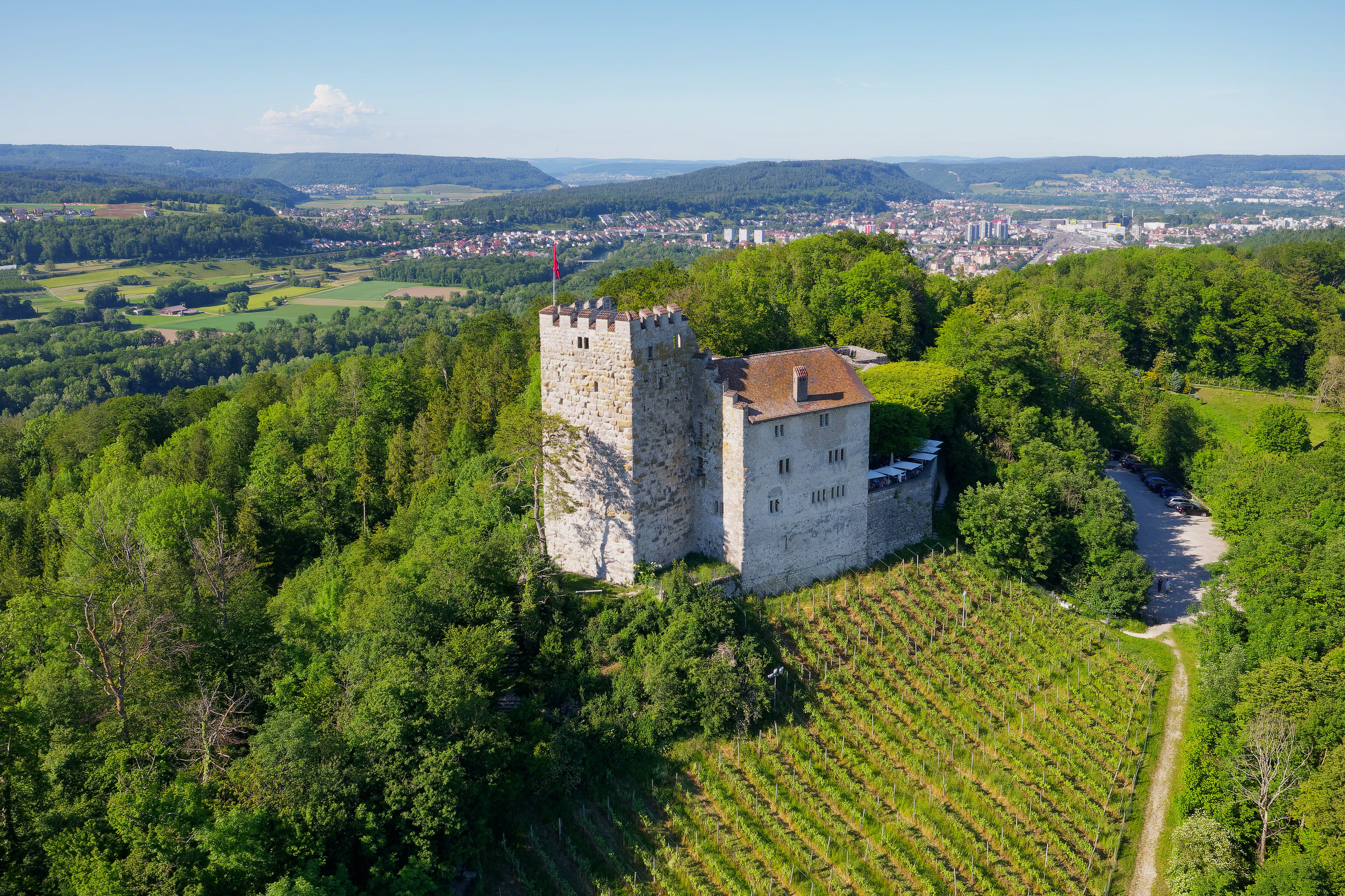
Habsburg Castle, Switzerland

The Eastern Alps had been included in the Frankish Empire since the 9th century. From the High Middle Ages and throughout the Early Modern era, the political history of the Eastern Alps can be considered almost totally in terms of the advance or retreat of the house of Habsburg. The Habsburgers' original home was in the lower valley of the Aar, at Habsburg castle. They lost that district to the Swiss in 1415, as they had previously lost various other sections of what is now Switzerland. But they built an impressive empire in the Eastern Alps, where they defeated numerous minor dynasties. They won the duchy of Austria with Styria in 1282, Carinthia and Carniola in 1335, Tirol in 1363, and the Vorarlberg in bits from 1375 to 1523, not to speak of minor "rectifications" of frontiers on the northern slope of the Alps. But on the other slope their progress was slower, and finally less successful. It is true that they won Primiero quite early (1373), as well as (1517) the Ampezzo Valley and several towns to the south of Trento. In 1797 they obtained Venetia proper, in 1803 the secularized bishoprics of Trento and Brixen (as well as that of Salzburg, more to the north), besides the Valtellina region, and in 1815 the Bergamasque valleys, while the Milanese had belonged to them since 1535. But in 1859 they lost to the house of Savoy both the Milanese and the Bergamasca, and in 1866 Venetia proper also, so that the Trentino was then their chief possession on the southern slope of the Alps. The gain of the Milanese in 1859 by the future king of Italy (1861) meant that Italy then won the valley of Livigno (between the Upper Engadine and Bormio), which is the only important bit it holds on the non-Italian slope of the Alps, besides the county of Tenda (obtained in 1575, and not lost in 1860), with the heads of certain glens in the Maritime Alps, reserved in 1860 for reasons connected with hunting. Following World War I and the demise of Austria-Hungary, there were important territorial changes in the Eastern Alps.

== Modern history (1900 to present) ==
=== Population ===
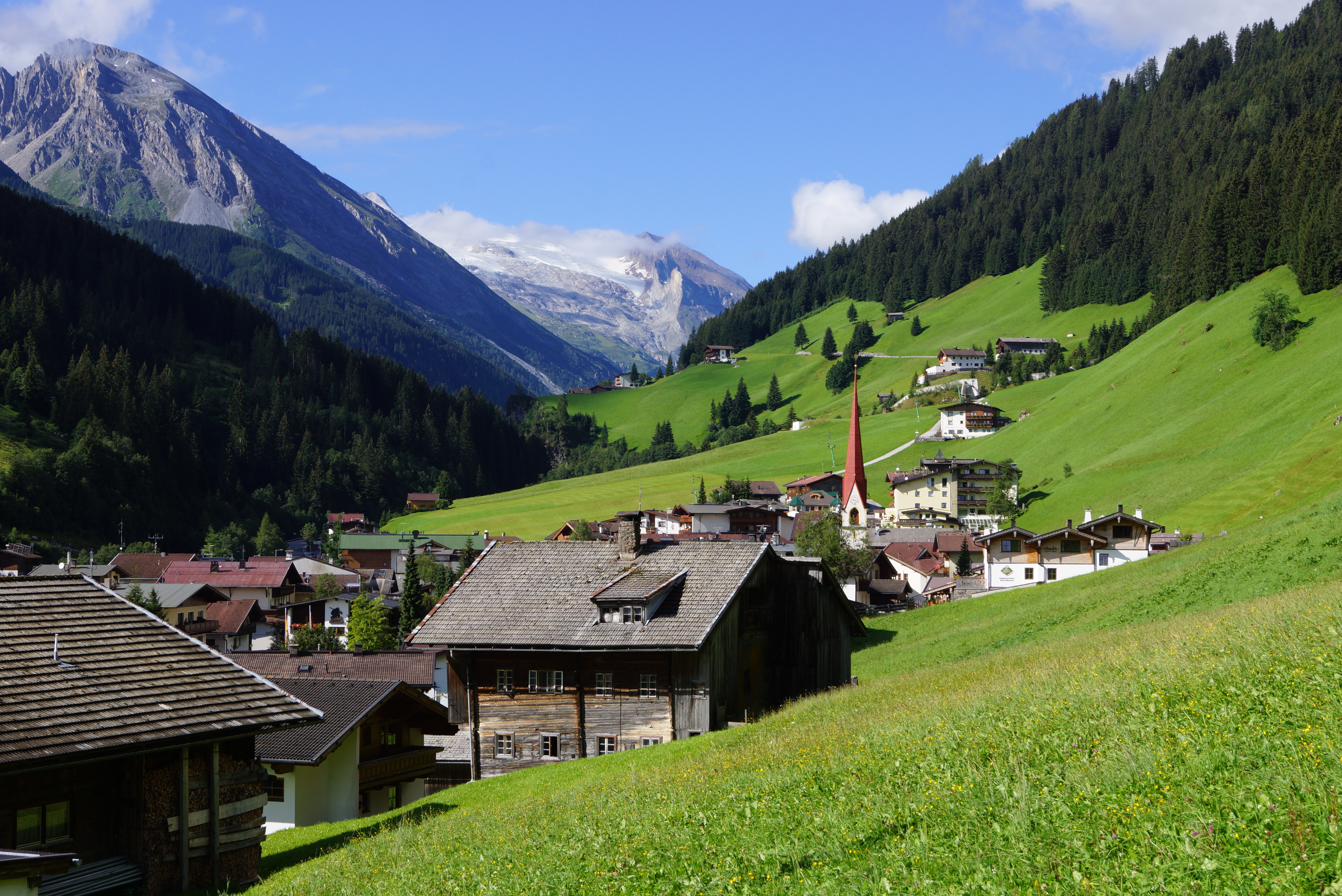
A typical alpine village in the Tuxertal valley of Tyrol, Austria

For the modern era it is possible to offer a quantitative estimate of the population of the Alpine region. Within the area delimited by the Alpine Convention, there were about 3.1 million inhabitants in 1500, 5.8 in 1800, 8.5 in 1900 and 13.9 in 2000.

Sixteenth-century scholars, especially those from cities near the Alps, began to show a greater interest for the mountain phenomena. Their curiosity was also aroused by important questions of the genesis of the earth and the interpretation of the Bible. By the eighteenth century, a distinctive enthusiasm for nature and the Alps spread in European society. An example thereof is the famous multi-volume work "Voyages dans les Alpes" (1779–1796) by Horace-Bénédict de Saussure. In his work the naturalist from Geneva described, among other things, his 1787 ascent of Mont Blanc at 4800 metres above sea level. This new interest is also reflected in literature, most notably by Jean-Jacques Rousseau’s best-selling romantic novel "Julie, ou la nouvelle Heloise" (1761). These cultural developments resulted in a growth of interest in the Alps as a travel destination and laid the foundation for modern tourism. As Europe was getting increasingly more urbanised, the Alps distinguished themselves as a place of nature. During the colonial expansion many mountains in Asia, Australia and America were now named after the Alps as well.

During the nineteenth and twentieth centuries several important changes occurred. First, the Alpine population was now characterised by a particular growth rate, which was increasingly differentiated from that of the more dynamic non-mountain areas. Second, the migratory fluxes became ever more important and ever more directed toward extra-European destinations. Beginning in the early twentieth century, several regions were affected by depopulation. This process amplified the imbalanced distribution of the population within the Alps, because the urban centres at lower altitudes experienced strong growth and clearly became the most important dynamic localities during the twentieth century.

=== Economy ===
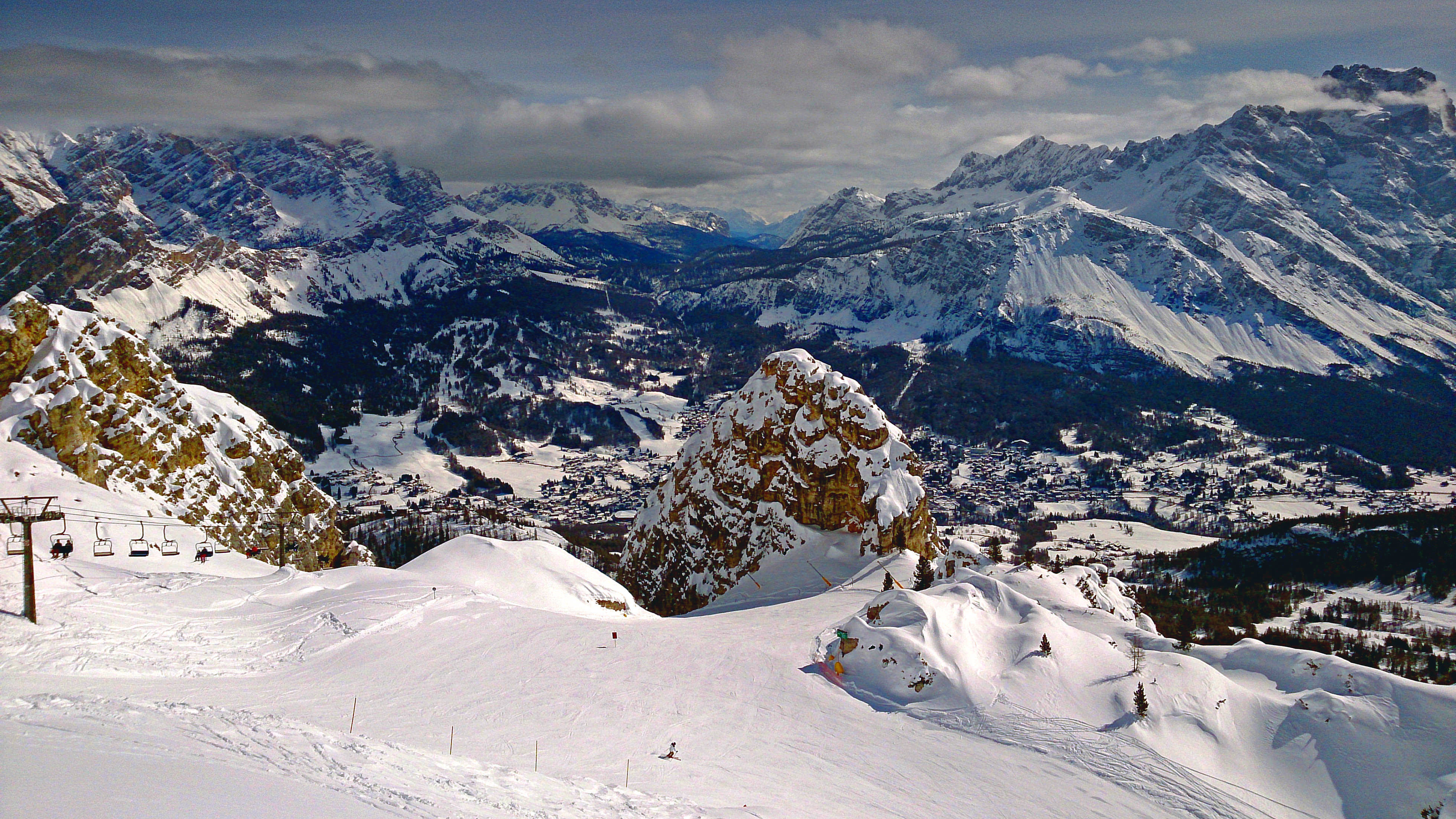
The ski resort in Cortina d'Ampezzo, Veneto, Italy

The economy showed many signs of change too. First of all, the agriculture sector started to lose importance, and sought to survive by introducing specialised crops in valley bottoms and reinforcing cattle-raising at higher altitudes. This profound transformation was obviously due to the spread of industrialisation in Europe during the nineteenth century, which had its impact on the Alps, directly or indirectly. On the one hand, activities such as iron manufacturing, which had become prominent during the early modern era, reached their limits due to transportation costs and the increasing scale of business operations. On the other hand, at the turn of the twentieth century, new opportunities emerged for the manufacturing sector, due largely to electric power, one among the main innovations of the second industrial revolution. Abundant water and steep slopes made the Alps an ideal environment for the production of hydroelectric power. Hence many industrial sites appeared there.

However, it was undoubtedly the service sector that experienced the most important new development within the Alpine economy: the rapid rise of tourism. The first phase was dominated by summertime visits and, by about 1850, the expansion of Alpine health resorts and spas. Later, tourism started to shift to the winter season, particularly after the introduction of ski-lifts in early twentieth century. For a long time, transit traffic and trade had been an essential part of the service sector in the Alps. The traditional routes and activities began to face strong competition from the construction of railway lines and tunnels such as the Semmering (1854), the Brenner (1867), the Fréjus/Mont-Cenis (1871), the Gotthard (1882), the Simplon (1906) and the Tauern (1909). In 2016 opened the 57 km long Gotthard Base Tunnel. With a maximum elevation of only 549 metres above sea level, it is the first flat direct route through the Alpine barrier.

In general, it is noteworthy that even if modern industry – tourism, the railway and later the highway system – represented opportunities for the Alps, complementing its traditional openness to new challenges, it also produced negative consequences, such as the human impact on the environment.

Milestones of railway transit across the Alps
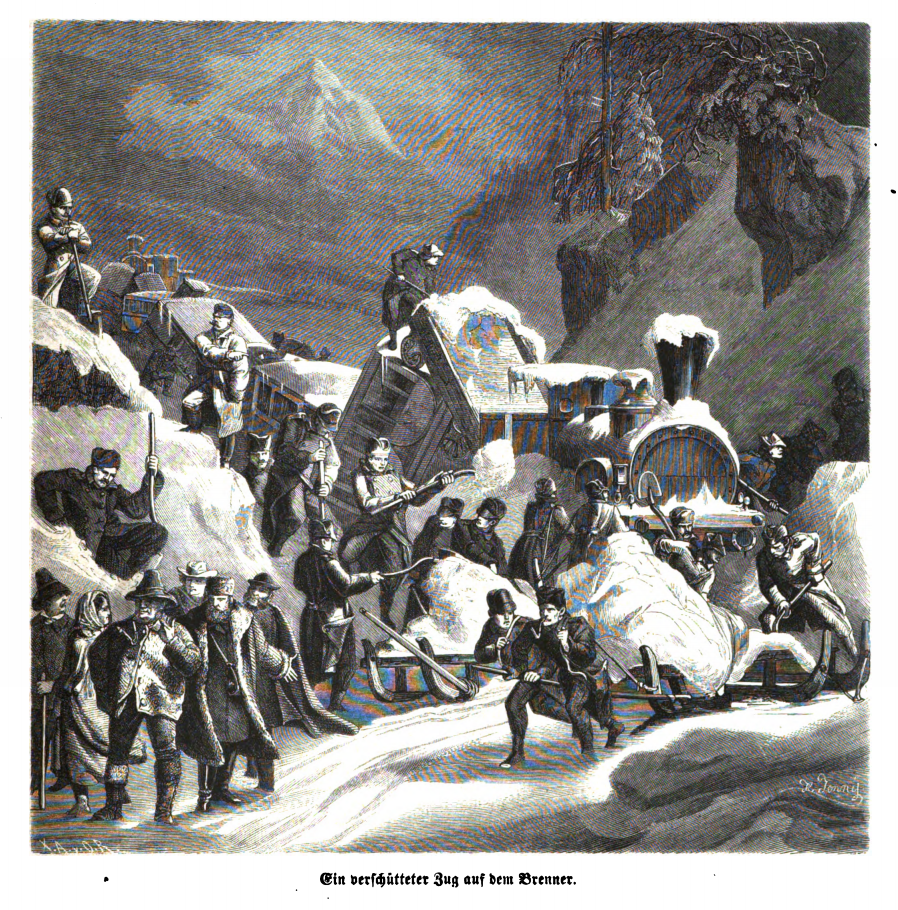
Brenner Pass Railway (1867), maximum elevation: 1,371 m

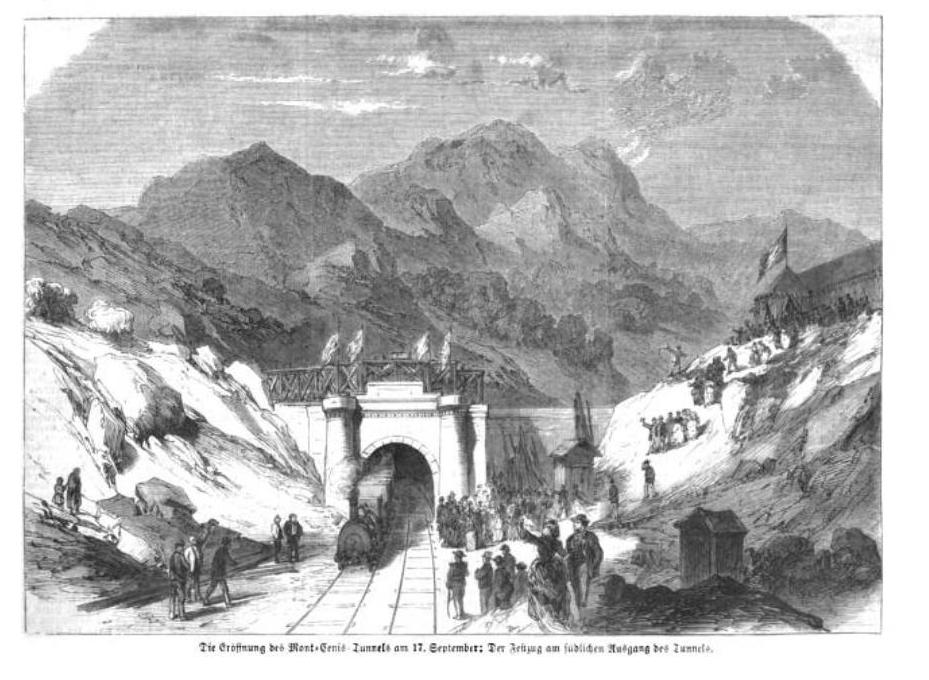
Fréjus Rail Tunnel (1871), maximum elevation: 1,338 m

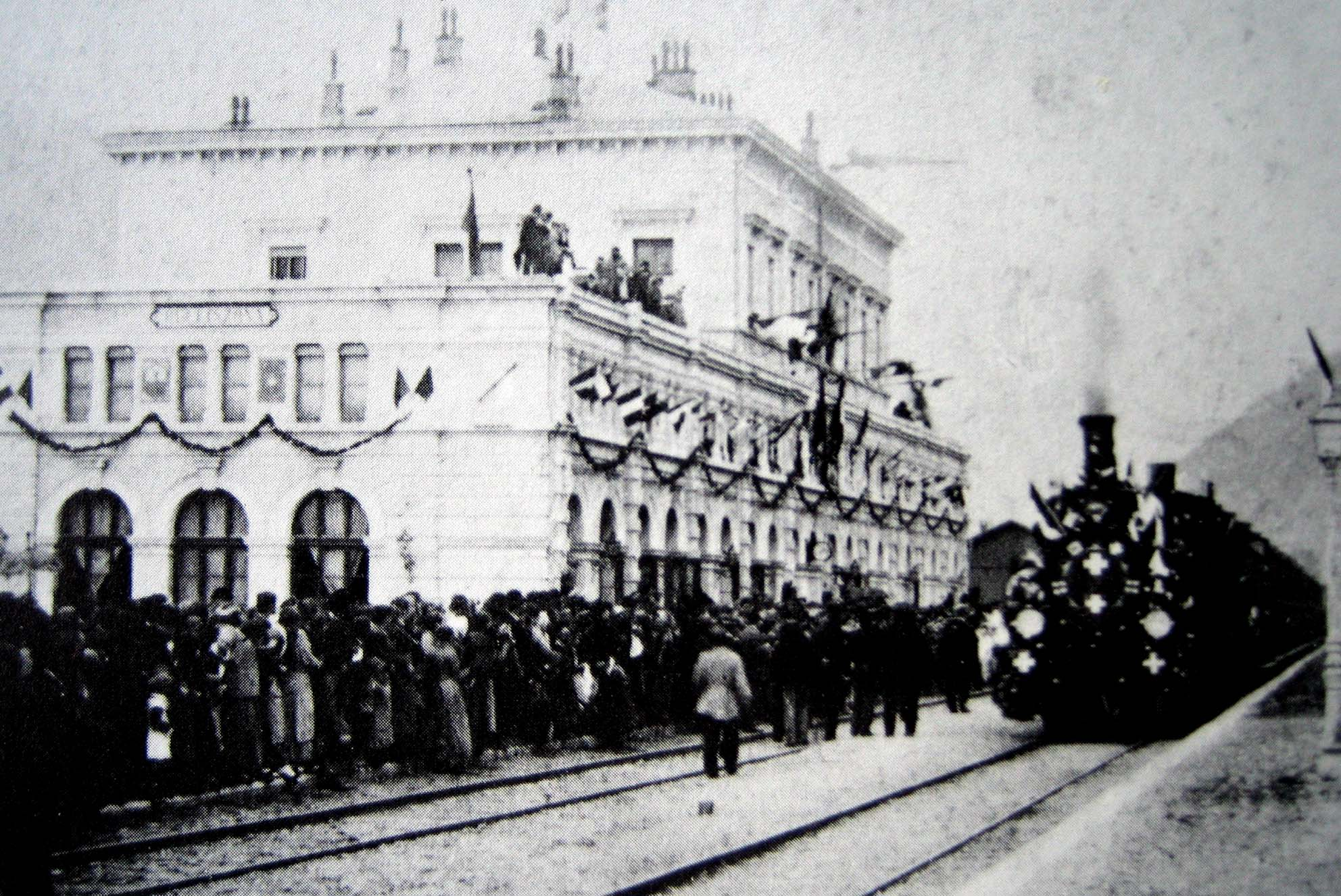
Gotthard Rail Tunnel (1882), maximum elevation: 1,151 m

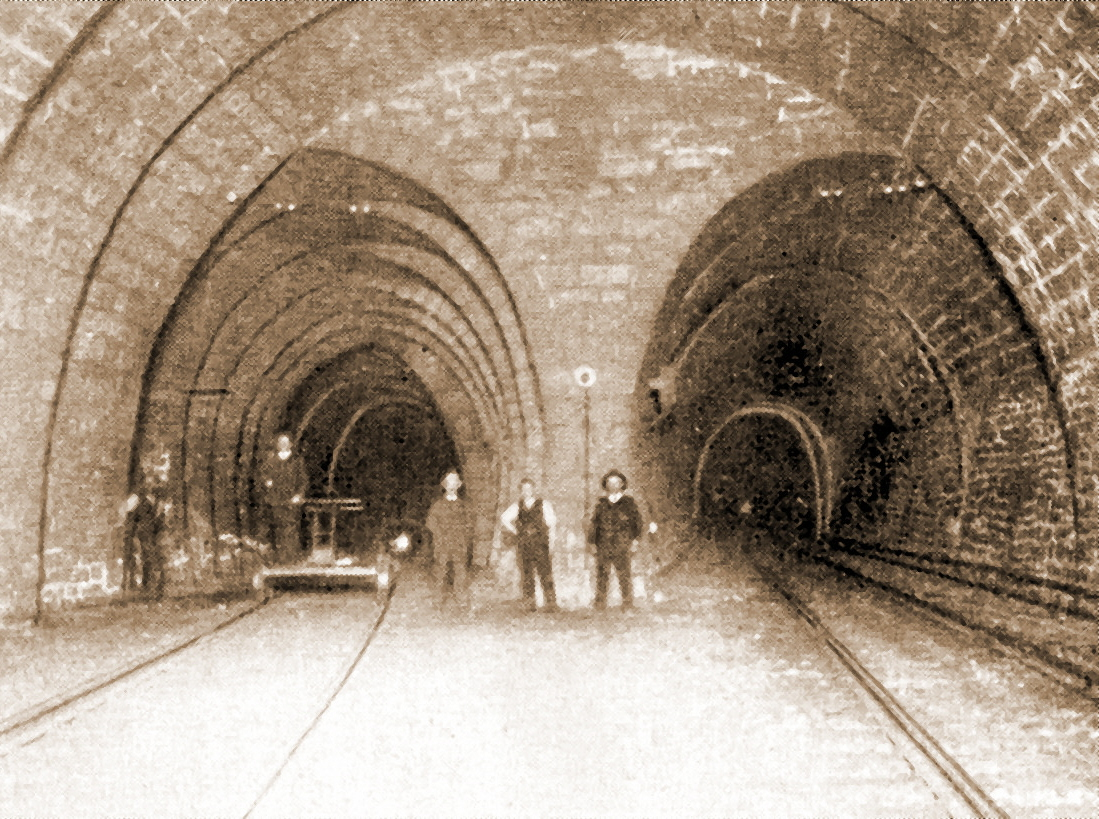
Simplon Tunnel (1906), maximum elevation: 705 m

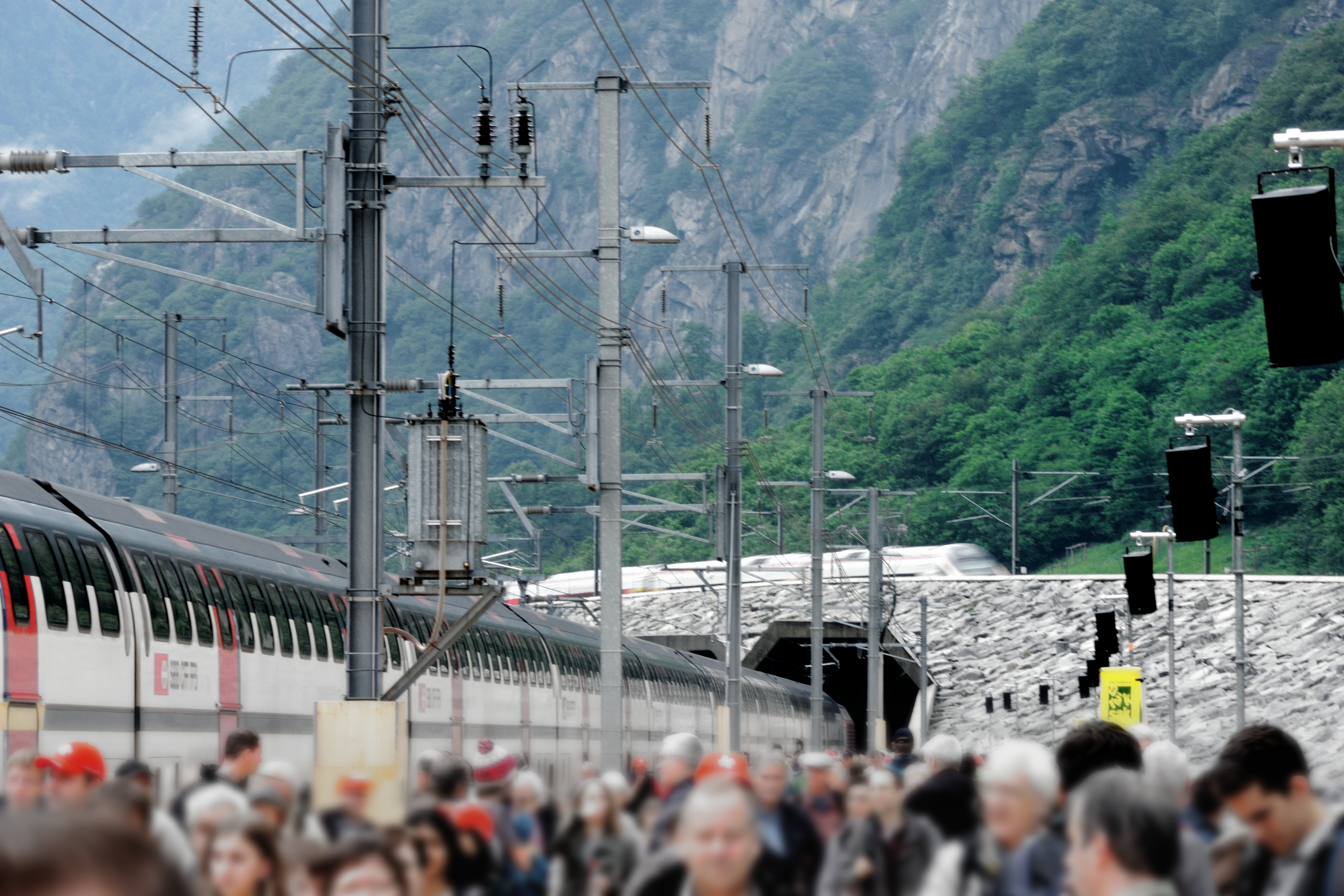
Gotthard Base Tunnel (2016), maximum elevation: 549 m

=== Political history ===
Like other parts of Europe, the Alpine region was affected by the formation of the nation states that produced tensions between various groups and had consequences for border areas. In these regions, the coercive power of the state was felt much more strongly that it had been before. Borders lost their permeability and now bisected areas formerly characterised by a shared sense of community and ongoing exchanges. During World War I the eastern Alpine region was one of the epicentres of the conflict.

After World War II, the Alps entered a new phase. At one and the same time, regional identities were reinforced and a common Alpine identity was constructed. A remarkable step was made in 1991 with the signing of the Alpine Convention between all Alpine countries and the European Union. This process was strengthened by the appearance of a new set of cultural values for the Alps. In the nineteenth century, there had been a tension between the romantic advocates of the "sacredness" of the Alpine peaks (such as John Ruskin), and modern mountain climbers (such as Leslie Stephen), who promoted the notion of the Alps as the "playground of Europe". In the twentieth century, the mountains acquired a clearly positive, iconic, status as places unsullied by undesirable urban influences such as pollution, noise and so on.

=== Tourism and alpinism ===
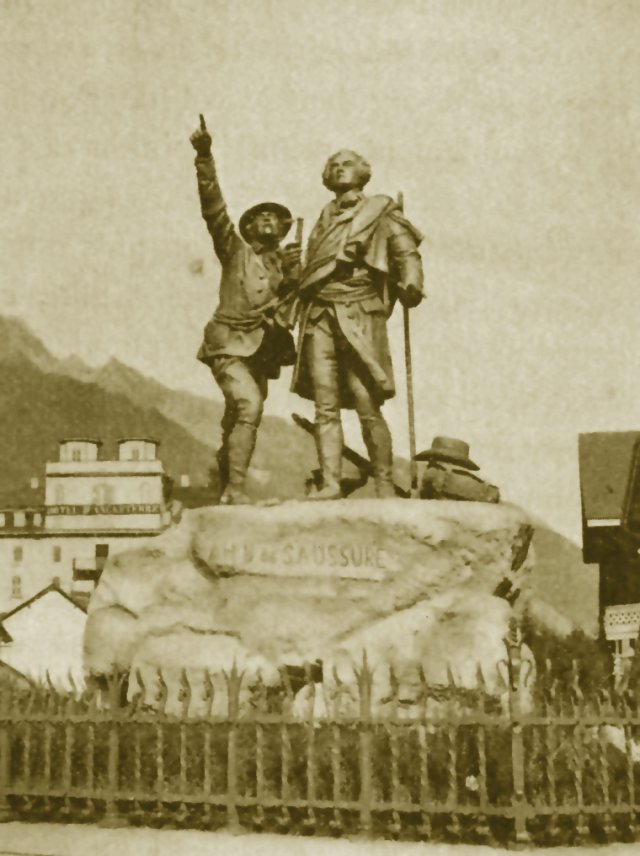
Chamonix, The Monument of Horace-Bénédict de Saussure and Jacques Balmat, in honor of their climb of Mont Blanc

The fascination that the Alps exerted on the British has to be related to the general increase in charm and appeal of this mountain range during the eighteenth century. Yet British particularities were involved as well. Traditionally, many Englishmen felt the attraction of the Mediterranean, which was associated with the practice of the Grand Tour, and thus had to cross Europe and the Alps to reach it. From a place of transit, the Alps turned into a tourist destination as the flow of people and means of transport increased. Moreover, with the invention of new sports the Alps became an area of experimental training. The Alps offered many mountain climbers a degree of difficulty that fit their expectations.

The convergence of these phenomena granted to Alpine tourism a central position. It intensified from the middle of the nineteenth century onwards and, in spite of fluctuations, would never lose its importance. Railway companies, travel guides, travelogues and travel agents joined forces to make the Alps a prestigious tourist destination. With Thomas Cook in particular, the Alps appeared, as early as 1861, in the catalog of tourist offers and were instrumental in the establishment of a "truly international industry" of tourism. This industry developed the infrastructure: railway lines, hotels and other services such as casinos, promenades, improvements, and funiculars.

The conquest of the Alps by British tourists was achieved along with their domestication and with the passionate participation of local, regional and national élites, be they political, economic or cultural. Leslie Stephen, in a best-selling book first published in 1871, defined the Alps as "the Playground of Europe". The book highlights the incredible success of the mountains but it also reflects the tensions that emerged among their visitors. There was a clash between the "real enthusiasts", sensitive to beauty, and the "flock of ordinary tourists" sticking to their customs and comforts.

During the twentieth century, then, the Alps were involved in the globalisation of tourism, a process that caused the multiplication of its destinations. However, in the British population these mountains retained an undeniable attraction. In fact, the British continued to view winter sports in particular (such as skiing, skating, bobsleigh, curling) as significant grounds for justifying their travel and their perpetuation of a unique culture. The personalities of Gavin de Beer and Arnold Lunn represent this attitude through a prolific interpretation of this mountain range from every possible perspective. Indeed, the British have never ceased to love and be attracted to the Alps. This is not likely to end soon, if the advertisements and presentations of the major Alpine resorts that intersperse the Sunday editions of the major newspapers are any indicator.

== Linguistic history ==
The Alps are at the crossroads of the French, Italian, German and South Slavic linguistic sprachraums. They also act as a linguistic refugium, preserving archaic dialects such as Romansh, Walser German or Romance Lombardic. Extinct languages known to have been spoken in the Alpine region include Rhaetic, Lepontic, Ligurian and Langobardic.

As a result of the complicated history of the Alpine region, the native language and the national feelings of the inhabitants do not always correspond to the current international borders. The Trentino-Alto Adige/Südtirol region, which was annexed by Italy after World War I, has a German-speaking majority in the northern province of South Tyrol. There are Walser German speakers to found in northern Italy near the Swiss border. There are some French and Franco-Provencal-speaking districts in the Italian Aosta Valley, while there are clusters of Slovene-speakers in the Italian portion of the Julian Alps, in the Resia Valley (where the archaic Resian dialect of Slovene is still spoken) and in the mountain district known as Venetian Slovenia.

== See also ==
- Tauredunum event

== Bibliography ==
- John W. Cole, Eric R. Wolf: The hidden frontier: ecology and ethnicity in an alpine valley, University of California Press (1999), ISBN 9780520216815.
- Histoire des Alpes – Storia delle Alpi – Geschichte der Alpen: annual journal of the International Society for Alpine History with French, Italian and German articles and English abstracts, Chronos Verlag, Zurich, from 1996, ISSN 1660-8070; online access on http://www.arc.usi.ch/labisalp or http://retro.seals.ch.
- Marco Bellabarba, Hannes Obermair, Hitomi Sato (eds): Communities and Conflicts in the Alps from the Late Middle Ages to Early Modernity. Il mulino – Duncker & Humblot, Bologna-Berlin 2015. ISBN 978-88-15-25383-5, and ISBN 978-3-428-14821-9.
- Bergier, Jean-François: Pour une histoire des Alpes, Moyen Âge et Temps modernes. Ashgate, Aldershot UK 1997, ISBN 0-86078-653-6.
- Braudel, Fernand: The Mediterranean and the Mediterranean World in the Age of Philip II, 2. vols. University of California Press, Berkeley 1995 (first French edition 1949/66). ISBN 978-0-520-20308-2
- Cuaz, Marco: Le Alpi. Il mulino, Bologna 2005, ISBN 88-15-10535-2.
- Dictionnaire encyclopédique des Alpes, 2 vols. Glénat, Grenoble 2006, ISBN 2-7234-3527-X and 2-7234-5073-2.
- Fontaine, Laurence: Pouvoir, identités et migrations dans les hautes vallées des Alpes occidentales (XVIIe-XVIIIe siècle). Presses Universitaires de Grenoble, Grenoble 2003. ISBN 2-7061-1100-3.
- Guichonnet, Paul (ed.): Histoire et Civilisation des Alpes, 2 vols. Editions Privat Toulouse and Payot Lausanne 1980, ISBN 2-7089-2372-2.
- Leonardi, Andrea; Hans Heiss (eds.): Tourismus und Entwicklung im Alpenraum, 18.-20. Jahrhundert. Studien-Verlag, Innsbruck 2003. ISBN 978-3-7065-1833-8.
- Lorenzetti, Luigi; Raul Merzario: Il fuoco acceso. Famiglie e migrazioni alpine nell’Italia d’età moderna. Donzelli editore, Rome 2005. ISBN 88-7989-987-2.
- Mathieu, Jon, The Alpine Region, EGO - European History Online, Mainz: Institute of European History, 2017, retrieved: March 8, 2021 (pdf).
- Mathieu, Jon: History of the Alps 1500–1900. Environment, Development, and Society. Translated by Matthew Vester. West Virginia University Press, Morgantown 2009 (first German edition 1998), ISBN 1-933202-34-3.
- Mathieu, Jon; Simona Boscani Leoni (eds.): Die Alpen! Zur europäischen Wahrnehmungsgeschichte seit der Renaissance. Peter Lang, Berne 2005, ISBN 3-03910-774-7.
- Reichler, Claude: La découverte des Alpes et la question du paysage. Georg Editeur, Geneva, ISBN 2-8257-0782-1.
- Tschofen, Bernhard: Berg, Kultur, Moderne. Volkskundliches aus den Alpen. Sonderzahl-Verlag, Vienna 1999. ISBN 3-85449-163-8.
- Viazzo, Pier Paolo: Upland communities. Environment, population and social structure in the Alps since the sixteenth century. Cambridge University Press, Cambridge 1989, ISBN 0-521-30663-9.
- Katharina Winckler: Die Alpen im Frühmittelalter: Die Geschichte eines Raumes in den Jahren 500 bis 800. Böhlau, Wien 2012, ISBN 978-3205787693; online access ont http://www.oapen.org/home
