= Sydel Silverman =

American social anthropologist (1933–2019)

- Born: Sydel Finfer; May 20, 1933; Chicago, Illinois US
- Died: March 25, 2019 (aged 85); New York City
- Other name: Sydel Silverman Wolf
- Education: University of Chicago; Columbia University
- Spouse(s): Mel Silverman (1953–1966) (his death); Eric Wolf (1972–1999) (his death)
- Children: Eve Silverman; Julie Yorn
- Scientific career
- Fields: Anthropology
- Workplaces: Queens College; Graduate Center, CUNY; Wenner-Gren Foundation
- Theses: The Female Climacterium (Masters thesis) (1957); "Landlord and peasant in an Umbrian community" (PhD dissertation) (1963)

Sydel Finfer Silverman Wolf (May 20, 1933 – March 25, 2019) was an American anthropologist notable for her work as a researcher, writer, and advocate for the archival preservation of anthropological research. Silverman's early research focused on the study of complex societies and the history of anthropology. This work involved conducting anthropological research in Central Italy, with a focus on traditional agrarian systems, land reform, and festivals in central Italy. She later became active as an administrator, advocating for the study of cultural anthropology and an important force within the community where she organized discussions and symposia around the topic of preserving the anthropological records.

== Early life and education ==
Silverman was born in the Lawndale neighborhood on the west side of Chicago, Illinois, to Joseph Finfer, a rabbi and kosher shohet butcher, and Elizabeth Finfer (née Bassman), a cook. The youngest of seven children, her family was Orthodox Jewish and was very poor. Her parents came from Lithuania when they were adults.

Silverman's interest in anthropology began at an early age, thanks in part to her uncle Hirshel Bassman. With her uncle, Silverman explored ideas such as mysticism and "oriental religions."

In 1951, Silverman graduated from high school and began her studies at the University of Illinois at Navy Pier as a pre-med student. After two years, she applied to the University of Chicago's program in Committee on Human Development, and began studies at the University of Chicago in biology, psychology, and sociology-anthropology. In 1957, Silverman received a master's degree from the Committee on Human Development. Her thesis, The Female Climacterium was published the same year.

In 1957, Silverman enrolled at the PhD program in Anthropology at Columbia University. Conrad Arensberg's work in the Mediterranean, as well as a personal interest in the region, led Silverman to select Italy as the focus of her dissertation research.

== Career ==
=== Early career ===
Silverman's dissertation research was focused in the Italian village of Montecastello di Vibio. Her work in this region began in August 1960. Her work was one of the initial social-anthropological studies of Central Italy, describing the mezzadria, the traditional agrarian system of the region. Shortly after Silverman's research, the mezzadria was abolished by law.

In 1963, Silverman received a PhD in anthropology from Columbia University for a dissertation Landlord and peasant in an Umbrian community, subsequently used as the basis of her first book, Three bells of civilization: the life of an Italian hill town. This early work remains one of Silverman's most-cited contributions in the academic community. Silverman's dissertation research was also the foundation of several additional journal articles.

Some of Silverman's photography from this period, (specifically 1960–1961), including photographs by her late husband Melvin Silverman can be viewed online.

=== Teaching ===
After completing her PhD, Silverman worked as a teacher by Queens College in New York City from 1962 to 1975, while continuing her research in Italy. Her research included a 1967 study of land reform in the South of Italy, and several field seasons in Central Italy focused on a comparative study of competitive regional festivals. From this time, Silverman's publications on Palio of Siena are the most noteworthy. At Queens College Silverman began her career as an administrator when she was elected as department chair in 1970.

=== Administration ===
(1975–1986) From 1975 to 1986 Silverman was the executive officer of the CUNY Graduate Center PhD Program in Anthropology. Under her leadership, the program rose from disorganization and threat of disbandment to one of the top ten anthropology doctoral programs in the United States of America. For a time, Silverman was also the acting Dean of Graduate Studies at CUNY.

Silverman moved to the Wenner-Gren Foundation in 1987, where she was appointed president of the foundation, serving from 1987 to 1999. She was spokesperson for the organization, advocating for the field of anthropology as well as overseeing administrative tasks including fellowship and grant funding. Silverman organized twenty-five international symposia during her years at Wenner-Gren. These symposia became the topic of her 2002 book, The Beast on the Table which offers a rich narrative concerning the living history of anthropology.

Outside of her fieldwork, advocacy, and administrative work, Silverman's other major research interest has been on anthropology itself—particularly the history of anthropology and the practice of anthropology. In addition to what has already been discussed, Silverman's work at Wenner-Gren included an effort to preserve anthropological records.

Silverman's selected bibliography is included below, and more detailed descriptions of a number of her books has been provided by archivist Christy Fic in the Register to the Papers of Sydel Silverman. Silverman's work in this area has spanned the course of her long career, and continued into her retirement in 1999.

Silverman was President Emerita of the Wenner-Gren Foundation for Anthropological Research and professor emerita of Anthropology at the City University of New York.

== Personal life ==
In December 1953, Silverman married the painter Mel Silverman, who died in 1966. In 1972 she married anthropologist Eric Wolf, who died in 1999.

In addition to two stepchildren from Wolf's first marriage, the couple had two children, Eve Silverman and film producer, Julie Yorn.

Silverman died on March 25, 2019, in New York City.

== Selected works and publications ==
Monographs

- Silverman, Sydel (1975). Three bells of civilization : the life of an Italian hill town. New York: Columbia University Press. ISBN 0231038046.
- Silverman, Sydel (1981). Totems and teachers : perspectives on the history of anthropology. New York: Columbia Univ.Pr. ISBN 0231050860.
- Wolf, Eric R. Wolf with Sydel Silverman; foreword by Aram A. Yengoyan (2001). Pathways of Power Building an Anthropology of the Modern World. Berkeley: University of California Press. ISBN 9780520924871.
- Silverman, Sydel (2002). The beast on the table : conferencing with anthropologists. Walnut Creek, CA: AltaMira Press. ISBN 0759102392.
- Silverman, Sydel (2003). Totems and teachers : key figures in the history of anthropology (2. ed.). Walnut Creek, CA: AltaMira Press. ISBN 075910459X.
- Silverman, Sydel & Susan McKinnon (2005). Complexities : beyond nature & nurture. Chicago, Ill.: University of Chicago Press. ISBN 0226500233.
- Barth, Fredrik, Andre Gingrich, Robert Parkin, and Sydel Silverman (2005). One discipline, four ways British, German, French, and American anthropology ([Online-Ausg.]. ed.). Chicago: University of Chicago Press. ISBN 9780226038292.
- Cherneff, Jill & Eve Hochwald; foreword by Sydel Silverman (2006). Visionary observers : anthropological inquiry and education. Lincoln: University of Nebraska Press. ISBN 080326464X.
- Ruwell, Mary Elizabeth (1995). Silverman, Sydel and Nancy J. Parezo (ed.). Preserving the Anthropological Record: The National Anthropological Archives (PDF). Wenner-Gren Foundation for Anthropological Research, Inc.
