= Kevin Yorn =

American lawyer

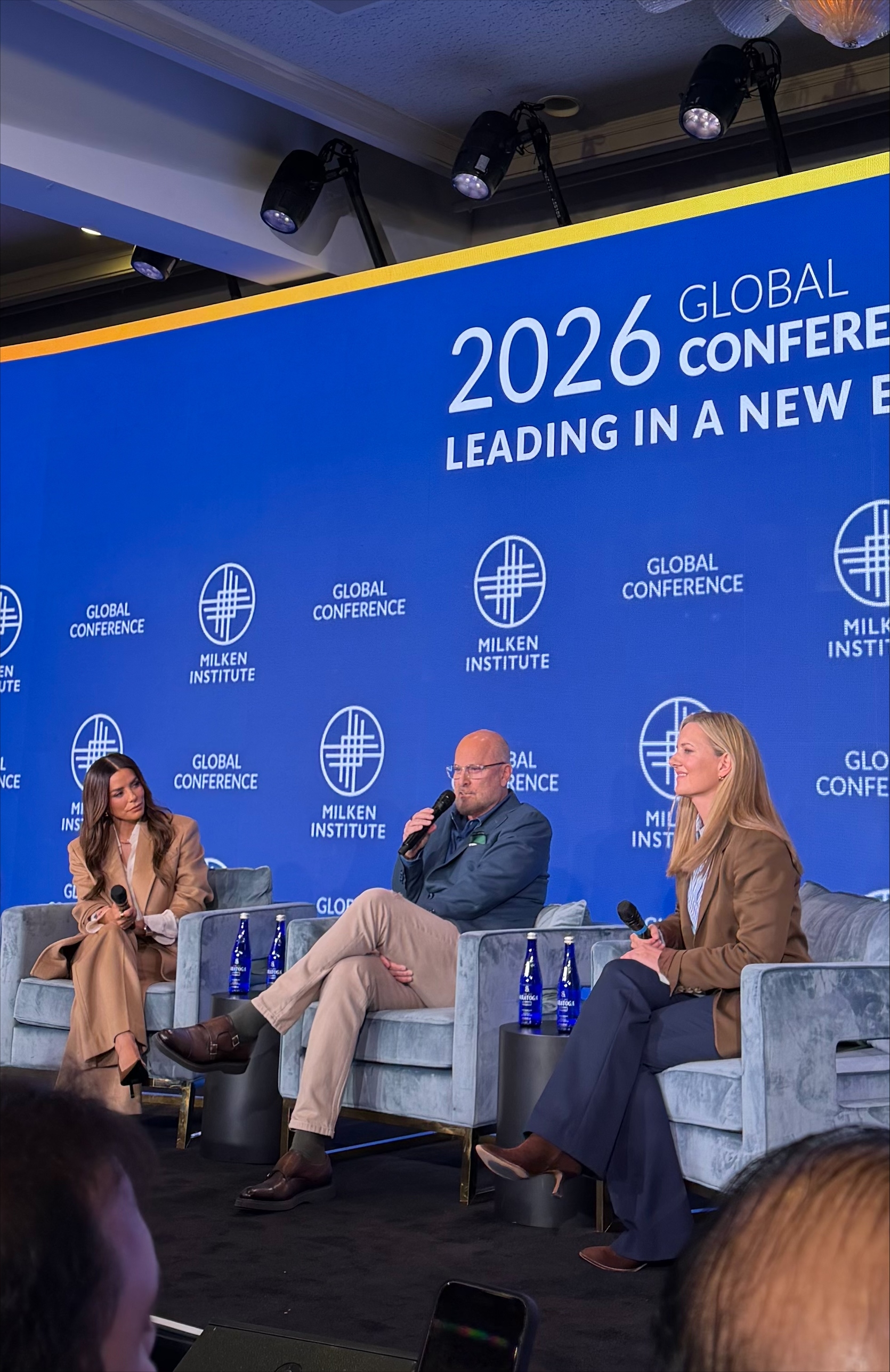
- Milken Global Conference 2026
- Born: Kevin Brett Yorn; July 4, 1965 (age 61); Montville, New Jersey
- Education: Tulane University; Muhlenberg College
- Occupations: Entertainment attorney; Investor
- Years active: 1990-present
- Known for: Co-founder of Yorn Levine and Broadlight Capital
- Board member of: Cedars-Sinai Medical Center; Common Sense Media
- Spouse: Julie Silverman (m. 1996; div. 2005)
- Children: 1
- Relatives: Pete Yorn (brother)

Kevin Brett Yorn is an American entertainment attorney and investor. He co-founded Yorn Levine, an entertainment law firm, and BroadLight Capital, a private equity investment firm.

== Early life and education ==
Yorn was born on July 4, 1965 in Montville, New Jersey. His parents are Lawrence, a dentist and captain in the Army, and Joan. He has two brothers, Pete Yorn, a musician, and Rick Yorn, a talent manager.

Yorn is an alumnus of Muhlenberg College in Allentown, PA. He graduated with a Juris Doctor degree from Tulane University Law School in 1990 and was admitted to the State Bar of California in 1991. During law school, Yorn spent a summer clerking in the Beverly Hills district attorney's office.

== Career ==
=== Local government work ===
Yorn became a deputy district attorney in L.A. County after graduating from Tulane Law in 1990. He was in the D.A.’s office for five years, working in the Hardcore Gang Investigations Unit.

=== Yorn Levine ===
In 1996 Yorn was recruited from the D.A.'s office to partner with Michael Barnes, Kevin Morris and Brian Wolf, forming Barnes Morris Wolf & Yorn, based in Santa Monica.

Aspiring writer Anthony Zuiker asked Yorn for help in escaping a screenwriting contract so that he could go on to create the television series CSI, which premiered in 2000.

In 2013, Yorn worked on the deal to renew DeGeneres' talk show through 2016-17.

In the summer of 2014, Yorn's firm made a deal with Hulu for three years of South Park reruns, reportedly at a price of more than $80 million, and he helped Zuiker make content deals with YouTube and Yahoo. Yorn also created a joint venture with Warner Bros., Ellen DigitalVentures, to help take advantage of Ellen DeGeneres’ social media reach, digital video content, games and apps, including Heads Up!.

In 2018, his negotiations on behalf of Scarlett Johansson's remaining contractual obligations with Marvel Studios made her the highest paid actress in Hollywood according to Forbes. Yorn's deals for Zoe Saldaña in the Avatar and Marvel franchises made her the second highest paid actress in Hollywood. The Johansson negotiations were later referenced when she sued Disney for breach of contract in its handling of Black Widow's release.

Yorn has represented several of his clients in the misuse of their likeness by artificial intelligence. In 2023, he stated "we do not take these things lightly" after an advertisement with a generated version of Johansson was featured online. That same year, Matthew McConaughey filed voice and likeness trademarks with the United States Patent and Trademark Office in 2023 which were granted two years later. Yorn said his goal is to "protect someone's stealing somebody's voice".

Yorn represented Hwang Dong-hyuk and Kim Ji-yeon of Squid Game for the second and third seasons of the Netflix series. He negotiated the Apple TV deals for Jason Sudeikis and Bill Lawrence to return to Ted Lasso for a fourth season. Yorn also worked on the deals for Johansson's roles in Jurassic World Rebirth, The Batman: Part II and The Exorcist: Martyrs.

During the 2026 Milken Institute conference, Yorn and his client Eva Longoria discussed her work as an investor and he shared that her firm was a source of emergency funding for 2014's John Wick.

Yorn was listed among The Hollywood Reporter's Top 100 Entertainment Attorneys in 2013 and 2014, and one of Hollywood's top power lawyers every year between 2015 and 2026. His firm's other clients include Hailey Bieber, Stephen Curry, Snoop Dogg, Jonah Hill and Alicia Keys, among others.

=== BroadLight Capital ===
In 2021, Yorn co-founded the private equity investment firm BroadLight Capital with his brother Rick and David Dorfman. The firm is focused on investments in the global technology and consumer landscape such as MoonPay, ElevenLabs and Function Health. Its founders represent entertainers including Cameron Diaz, Leonardo DiCaprio and Chris Rock.

Azimut Holding purchased a 10 percent stake in BroadLight in 2022. It announced a $225 million for growth stage consumer and technology companies in 2023. Yorn has called the firm "a natural extension of the client-focused businesses". In 2024, BroadLight invested in Perplexity AI.

== Personal life ==
Yorn lives in Los Angeles, California. His parents moved to Los Angeles in 2000, and his mother became a receptionist at Yorn Levine.

In 1996, he married film producer Julie Silverman in a Jewish ceremony in Tarrytown, New York. They divorced in 2005.

He is an executive producer of the annual Stand Up to Cancer televised fundraising special. Yorn worked with his alma mater, Tulane University, to create funds for its law school's faculty in media law, sports law and intellectual property law. He has also supported the university's Gender & Sexuality Studies program in the School of Liberal Arts. He co-founded the Entertainment & Sports Law Conference at the Tulane University School of Law.
