= Developmentalist configuration =

Socio-anthropological term, cf. interactions between cosmopolitanism and nationalism

The developmentalist configuration is a socio-anthropological term used in development studies to describe the nature of "development." The term was coined by Jean-Pierre Olivier de Sardan and is used by post-development theorists, postcolonialists, critical theorists and others. The term describes the paradigm of governments, NGOs, individuals and researchers who seek to progress the "development" of a country through cosmopolitan ideals which bring about social change.

Jean-Pierre Olivier de Sardan describes "developmentalist configuration" as:

"[D]evelopment is not an entity whose existence (or absence) is to be sought for in the populations concerned. Instead, development exists based merely on the fact that there are actors and institutions who take development as an object or an end to which they devote time, money and professional competence...The 'developmentalist configuration’... [is] essentially a cosmopolitan world of experts, bureaucrats, NGO personnel, researchers, technicians, project chiefs and field agents, who make a living, so to speak, out of developing other people, and who, to this end, mobilize and manage a considerable amount of material and symbolic resources."

— Jean-Pierre Olivier de Sardan, Anthropology and Development: Understanding Contemporary Social Change
