= International Society for Alpine History =

Organization focusing on the European Alps

The International Association for Alpine History (French: Association Internationale pour l’Histoire des Alpes, Italian: Associazione Internazionale per la Storia delle Alpi, German: Internationale Gesellschaft für historische Alpenforschung) promotes research on the history of the European Alps and publishes an annual Journal. The Laboratorio de Storia delle Alpi at the Università della Svizzera italiana is the secretariat of the Society and develops its own scholarly agenda.

The International Association for Alpine History focusses on the history of the entire Alpine area (France, Monaco, Italy, Switzerland, Liechtenstein, Austria, Germany, Slovenia) and promotes scholarly contacts with mountain regions in other parts of Europe and of the world. It was founded by the eminent Swiss historian Jean-François Bergier in 1995 and is interested in all historical periods and in many forms of interdisciplinary cooperation. It organizes biennial conferences in different places of the Alps about specific subjects such as spatial mobility; mountains and cities; material culture; etc. More recently the Society has launched a research initiative on its own about the history of tourism. Membership rights in the Association are linked to the subscription of its journal.

== Journal ==
The annual journal of the Association is Histoire des Alpes – Storia delle Alpi – Geschichte der Alpen (started in 1996). The journal is peer-reviewed and publishes scholarly articles in French, Italian, and German, with English abstracts. As a rule, it includes selected contributions to the conferences of the association in one year and presents a special dossier in the next year. Individual articles from scholars of the Alpine area or from other regions are welcome for the Forum-section every second year. They can be proposed to the editorial team located in Laboratorio di Storia delle Alpi. The journal is available in print format and in an open access version.

== LabiSAlp ==
The Laboratorio di Storia delle Alpi LabiSAlp is part of the Università della Svizzera italiana (department Accademia di Architettura) and is located at the Villa Argentina, a remarkable 19th-century building in Mendrisio (Ticino, Switzerland). The LabiSAlp hosts the secretariat of the Association and develops its own activities in this field. It organizes scholarly meetings, public talks, and offers a framework for encounters for a group of young “associate researchers” in the universities of the Alpine area and beyond. It also initiates research projects, or participates in them—for instance, on the history of perception of the Alps since the Renaissance; about the Alps during war times; about the economic development of alpine regions, about the history of tourism and territorial regulation, etc. Besides the annual Journal, the LabiSAlp publishes the book series "Studies on Alpine History" and the working papers "Percorsi di ricerca".
