= Europe and the People Without History =

1982 book by Eric Wolf

- Author: Eric Wolf
- Language: English
- Genre: Non-fiction
- Publisher: University of California Press
- Publication date: 1982
- ISBN: 0520044592

Europe and the People Without History is a book by anthropologist Eric Wolf. First published in 1982, it focuses on the expansion of European societies in the modern era. "Europe and the people without history" is history written on a global scale, tracing the connections between communities, regions, peoples and nations that are usually treated as discrete subjects.

== A global history ==
The book begins in 1400 with a description of the trade routes a world traveller might have encountered, the people and societies they connected, and the civilizational processes trying to incorporate them. From this, Wolf traces the emergence of Europe as a global power, and the reorganization of particular world regions for the production of goods now meant for global consumption. Wolf differs from world-systems theory in that he sees the growth of Europe until the late eighteenth century operating in a tributary framework, and not capitalism. He examines the way that colonial state structures were created to protect tributary populations involved in the silver, fur and slave trades. Whole new "tribes" were created as they were incorporated into circuits of mercantile accumulation. The final section of the book deals with the transformation in these global networks as a result of the growth of capitalism with the industrial revolution. Factory production of textiles in England, for example transformed cotton production in the American south and Egypt, and eliminated textile production in India. All these transformations are connected in a single structural change. Each of the world's regions are examined in terms of the goods they produced in the global division of labour, as well as the mobilization and migration of whole populations (such as African slaves) to produce these goods. Wolf uses labor market segmentation to provide a historical account of the creation of ethnic segmentation. Where world-systems theory had little to say about the periphery, Wolf's emphasis is on the people "without history" (i.e. not given a voice in western histories) and on how they were active participants in the creation of new cultural and social forms emerging in the context of commercial empire.

== Mode of production analysis ==
Wolf distinguishes between three modes of production: capitalist, kin-ordered, and tributary. Wolf does not view them as an evolutionary sequence. He begins with capitalism because he argues our understanding of kin-ordered and tributary modes is coloured by our understanding of capitalism. He argues that apparently traditional, primitive, or precapitalist phenomena are not vestiges of earlier evolutionary stages of social development, but "products of the encounter between the West and the Rest". In the tributary mode, direct producers possess their own means of production, but their surplus production is taken from them through extra economic means. This appropriation is usually by some form of strong or weak state. In the kin-ordered mode of production, social labour is mobilized through kin relations (such as lineages), although his description makes its exact relations with tributary and capitalist modes unclear. The kin mode was further theorized by French structuralist Marxists in terms of 'articulated modes of production.' The kin-ordered mode is distinct again from Sahlins' formulation of the domestic mode of production.
