= The Hidden Frontier =

The Hidden Frontier: Ecology and Ethnicity in an Alpine Valley
- Author: John W. Cole, Eric R. Wolf
- Language: English
- Publisher: Academic Press
- Publication date: 1974
- ISBN: 0-12-785132-1 (first edition)
- Dewey Decimal: 301.294538
- LC Class: DG975.S1857 C64

The Hidden Frontier: Ecology and Ethnicity in an Alpine Valley is a classic study of ethnography, published in 1974 by John W. Cole and Eric R. Wolf.

The authors studied two Alpine villages in the Non Valley of the Tyrol region, St. Felix and Tret (part of Fondo municipality), only a mile apart and showed that in spite of identical ecological conditions, there were significant cultural differences, one village being German-speaking and the other Italian-speaking, so that the same physical environment was cast in terms of distinct cultural worlds in either village. Comparison of the two villages showed a clear cultural boundary, in effect that between Germanic Europe and Romance Europe along the southern, alpine boundary of German-speaking Europe. The German-speaking village St. Felix had the characteristic structure of a dispersed settlement (Streusiedlung) while the Italian-speaking settlement Tret had a clear nucleus. The authors trace the history of the region through the Middle Ages and down to the current inhabitants and their culture. For the German Tyroleans, the social center is the Hof, the individual estate and its land, ideally passed down the generations by impartible inheritance to the eldest son. For their Italian-speaking neighbors, the center of attention is not the land but the community, not just the village center but by extension also the nearby city, and the land tended to be divided equally among heirs.

The study followed an earlier report by Wolf (1962) on his study of the two villages. In the earlier study, Wolf argued for the primacy of culture over environmental constraints, in this case reflecting two distinct and deeply rooted cultural heritages, in the case of the German speakers of the Germanic migration period system of autarky of each family household, in the case of the Italian speakers the Mediterranean civilization inherited from the Roman Empire, where rural communities are culturally dominated by the urban centers on the coasts. The 1974 modified these conclusions, as it became apparent that while the division in the cultural ideals was indeed clear-cut between the villages, in reality the estates in both communities were kept at the same optimized sizes, showing that while cultural differences persisted for centuries even in close proximity, significantly affecting the political sphere, the necessities of the environmental conditions still dictated the same strategies for either community.

== Editions ==
- John W. Cole, Eric R. Wolf, The Hidden Frontier: Ecology and Ethnicity in an Alpine Valley, New York: Academic Press, 1974.
- republished with a new introduction by Eric Wolf, 1999, University of California Press, ISBN 978-0-520216815.

== See also ==
- Dispersed settlement
- Ethnic groups of Europe
- Ethnolinguistic group
- History of the Alps
- History of Tyrol
- Romano-Germanic culture
