= Eric Wolf =

Anthropologist

- Born: Eric Robert Wolf; 1 February 1923; Vienna, Austria
- Died: 6 March 1999 (aged 76); Irvington, New York
- Known for: The Hidden Frontier, Europe and the People Without History
- Spouse: Sydel Silverman
- Children: David Wolf, Daniel Wolf
- Scientific career
- Fields: Anthropology

Eric Robert Wolf (February 1, 1923 – March 6, 1999) was an anthropologist, best known for his studies of peasants, Latin America, and his advocacy of Marxist perspectives within anthropology.

== Early life ==
=== Life in Vienna ===
Wolf was born in Vienna, Austria to a Jewish family. Wolf has described his family as nonreligious, and said that he had little experience of a Jewish community while growing up. His father worked for a corporation and was a Freemason. Wolf described his mother, who had studied medicine in Russia, as a feminist—"not in terms of declarations, but in terms of her stand on human possibilities." In 1933, his father's work moved the family to Sudetenland, Czechoslovakia, where Wolf attended German Gymnasium. He describes his life in the 1920s and 30s in segregated Vienna and then in proletarianizing Czechoslovakia as attuning him early on to questions surrounding class, ethnicity, and political power. The social divisions in Vienna and conflicts in the region in the 1930s influenced Wolf's later scholarly work.

=== Studying and living in other countries ===
Wolf and his family moved to England and then to the United States to escape Nazism. He attended the Forest School, in Walthamstow, Essex, for two years, where he learned English and became interested in science, in part because of the strong emphasis on science of the school's Canadian headmaster. Despite learning English only when he arrived at the school as a teenager, he won the school's English essay prize. Moving to England also made him aware of cultural difference in a new way. In 1940, Wolf was interned in an alien detention camp in Huyton, near Liverpool, England. The detention camp was a high stress environment. It was there that Wolf became exposed to the organizational possibilities of socialism and communism. Through seminars organized by intellectuals in the camp, he was also exposed to the social sciences. Wolf was especially influenced by the German Jewish sociologist Norbert Elias who was also interned there.

Later in 1940, Wolf immigrated to the United States—the same period that 300,000 Jews emigrated to the U.S. from Germany. He enrolled in Queens College in New York City and also spent a summer at the Highlander Folk School in Tennessee in 1941. Spending time in the South allowed Wolf to see a different side of the United States than he was familiar with from New York. Wolf was in the army and fought overseas in World War II, serving in Italy with the 10th Mountain Division. After returning from Europe, Wolf finished college at Queens College. There, he became interested in anthropology, and later went on to study anthropology at Columbia University.

== Career ==
Columbia had been the home of Franz Boas and Ruth Benedict for many years and was the center of the spread of anthropology in America. By the time Wolf arrived at Columbia in the fall of 1946, the anthropology department had been mired in a 40-year conflict with Columbia University’s President Nicholas Murray Butler, an arch-conservative. Butler battled against Boas’ progressive vision of the academic as a ‘‘citizen-scientist,’’ what he felt was ‘‘a moral obligation to spread scientific knowledge as widely as possible.’’ Butler epitomized the very racism, militarism, and Eugenics that Boas vociferously opposed. Indeed, the department was in shambles, a condition that Wolf described as the worst educational experience he had known of. Part of the problem was that the chaos of a poorly staffed department could not keep up with the swelling number of veterans who entered with ample federal funds, yet were insufficiently prepared for the rigors of graduate training. Rather than being demoralized, Wolf and his classmates — Sidney Mintz, Stanley Diamond, Elman Service, John Murra, Robert Manners, and Morton Fried — formed an independent study group to prepare for qualifying examinations. They became bound through commonalities of seeing anthropology in connection with a socialist outlook. Representing this leftist political view, they jokingly called themselves the Mundial Upheaval Society.

By this time, Boas' anthropological style, which was suspicious of generalization and preferred detailed studies of particular subjects, was also out of fashion. The new chair of the anthropology department was Julian Steward, a student of Robert Lowie and Alfred Kroeber. Steward was interested in creating a scientific anthropology that explained how societies evolved and adapted to their physical environment.

Wolf was one of the coterie of students who developed around Steward. Older students' leftist beliefs, Marxist in orientation, worked well with Steward's less politicized evolutionism. Many anthropologists prominent in the 1980s such as Sidney Mintz, Morton Fried, Elman Service, Stanley Diamond, and Robert F. Murphy were among this group.

Wolf's dissertation research was carried out as part of Steward's 'People of Puerto Rico' project. Soon after, in 1961, Wolf began teaching at the University of Michigan, holding a position as a Distinguished Professor of Anthropology and Chair of the Department of Anthropology at Lehman College, CUNY before moving in 1971 to the CUNY Graduate Center, where he spent the remainder of his career. In addition to his Latin American work, Wolf also did fieldwork in Europe. With his student, John W. Cole, he conducted fieldwork on the culture, history, and settlement pattern of the Tyrol region, which was later published in their book The Hidden Frontier.

Wolf's key contributions to anthropology are related to his focus on issues of power, politics, and colonialism during the 1970s and 1980s when these topics were moving to the center of disciplinary concerns. His most well-known book, Europe and the People Without History, is famous for critiquing popular European history for largely ignoring historical actors outside the ruling classes. He also demonstrates that non-Europeans were active participants in global processes like the fur and slave trades and so were not 'frozen in time' or 'isolated' but had always been deeply implicated in world history.

In his Distinguished Lecture for the 1989 American Anthropological Association annual meeting, he warned that anthropologists are involved in 'continuously slaying paradigms, only to see them return to life, as if discovered for the first time.' This results in anthropology 'resembling a project in intellectual deforestation.' He argued that anthropology can be cumulative rather than continuous re-invention. Anthropologists, rather than focusing on high-flown theory, should aim for explanatory anthropology focused on the realities of life and fieldwork. Wolf struggled with colon cancer later in life. He died in 1999 in Irvington, New York.

== Work and ideas ==
=== Disciplinary imperialism ===
As a social scientist, already fighting from a less than ideal position in the wider academy, Eric Wolf criticized what he called disciplinary imperialism within social sciences, and between social sciences on one hand, and the natural sciences on another, banishing certain topics, such as history, as not academic enough. An example within social sciences is cultural anthropology winning over social anthropology (established in British academia), over sociology, and over history in the American and Americanized global academic community, since sociology was left with studying social mobility and social class, categories which neoliberals argue to be irrelevant, cultural anthropologists on the other hand proved useful for colonialist rule over "peoples without history", studying their myths, values, etc. This can be seen in mobilization of anthropologists for work with the U.S. military and Pentagon worldwide. His 1982 Europe and the People Without History reflected a turn away from, or fight against the disciplinary imperialism by dismantling ideas such as historical vs. non-historical people and societies, focusing on the relationship between European expansion and historical processes in the rest of the world—charting a global history, beginning in the 15th century. As reflected in the title of the book, he is interested in demonstrating ways in which societies written out of European histories were and are deeply involved in global historical systems and changes

=== Power ===
Much of Wolf's work deals with issues of power. In his book Envisioning Power: Ideologies of Dominance and Crisis (1999), Wolf deals with the relationship between power and ideas. He distinguishes between four modalities of power: 1. Power inherent in an individual; 2. Power as capacity of ego to impose one's will on alter; 3. Power as control over the contexts in which people interact; 4. Structural power: "By this I mean the power manifest in relationships that not only operates within settings and domains but also organizes and orchestrates the settings themselves, and that specifies the direction and distribution of energy flows". Based on Wolf's previous experience and later studies, he rejects the concept of culture that emerged from the counter-Enlightenment. Instead, he proposes a redefinition of culture that emphasizes power, diversity, ambiguity, contradiction and imperfectly shared meaning and knowledge.

=== Marxism ===
Wolf, known for his interest in and contributions to Marxist thought in anthropology, says that Marxism must be understood in the context of kinship and local culture. Culture and power are integrated, and mediated by ideology and property relations. There are two branches of Marxism, as defined by Wolf: Systems Marxism and Promethean Marxism. Systems Marxism is the discipline of postulates that could be used to frame general laws or patterns of social development. Promethean Marxism symbolized optimism for freedom from economic and political mistreatment and renowned reforming as the fashion to a more desirable future.

== Activism ==
Wolf was involved in the protests against the Vietnam War. During his time at the University of Michigan he organized one of the first teach-ins against the war. He also was critical of the close relationship between some anthropologists of Southeast Asia and the US government, and led an ultimately successful attempt to re-write the code of ethics of the American Anthropological Association to prevent anthropological data from knowingly being used in military campaigns.

== Personal ==
Wolf had two children from his first marriage, David and Daniel. Wolf later married the anthropologist Sydel Silverman. in the 1960s his best friend was the anthropologist Robert Burns Jr., father of the documentarian Ken Burns. While Ken Burns's mother was dying, he was cared for by Wolf's family.

== Published works ==
- The Mexican Bajío in the 18th Century (Tulane University, Middle American Research Institute, 1955)
- Sons of the Shaking Earth (University of Chicago Press, 1959)
- Anthropology (Prentice-Hall, 1964)
- Peasants (Prentice-Hall, 1966)
- Peasant Wars of the Twentieth Century (Harper & Row, 1969)
- Wrote Introduction and contributing essay in National Liberation: revolution in the third world / Edited by Norman Miller and Roderick Aya (The Free Press, 1971)
- The Hidden Frontier: Ecology and Ethnicity in an Alpine Valley (with John W. Cole) (Academic Press, 1974)
- Europe and the People Without History (University of California Press, 1982)
- "Distinguished Lecture: Facing Power—Old Insights, New Questions", American Anthropologist, New Series, Vol. 92, No. 3 (Sep., 1990), pp. 586–596.
- Envisioning Power: Ideologies of Dominance and Crisis (University of California Press, 1999)
- Pathways of Power: Building an Anthropology of the Modern World (with Sydel Silverman) (University of California Press, 2001)
