= Barbo =

Barbo is a surname. Notable people with the surname include:

- Antonio Gil Y'Barbo (1729–1809), pioneering settler of Nacogdoches, Texas
- Giovanni Barbo (died 1547), Italian Roman Catholic prelate
- Franz Engelbert Barbo von Waxenstein (1664–1706), Slovenian nobleman
- Josef Anton Barbo von Waxenstein (1863–1930), Slovenian aristocrat, politician, landowner, and member of the Imperial Council of Austria-Hungary
- Joseph Emanuel Barbo von Waxenstein (1825–1879), Slovenian politician and aristocrat
- Ludovico Barbo (1381–1443), Venetian Roman Catholic bishop
- Marco Barbo (1420–1491), Venetian cardinal of the Roman Catholic Church
- Pantaleone Barbo, diplomat of the Venetian Republic
- Pietro Barbo (Pope Paul II), Pope from 30 August 1464 to his death in 1471

== See also ==
- Barbo family, Venetian noble family
  - Barbo von Waxenstein, a Slovenian noble family of Italian origin
- Barbo Manor, an 18th-century manor-house in Slovenia
