= Wolf In der Maur =

20th-century Austrian journalist

- Born: Wolf von In der Maur auf Strelburg und zu Freifeld; 2 March 1924; Klagenfurt am Wörthersee, First Austrian Republic
- Died: 17 March 2005 (aged 81); Vienna, Austria
- Noble family: In der Maur
- Father: Gilbert von In der Maur
- Mother: Countess Maria Gertrude Valeska Rosa Aloisia Barbo von Waxenstein

Wolf-Bernhard Carl Borromaeus Paul Robert von In der Maur auf Strelberg und zu Freifeld, also known as Wolf In der Mauer or Wolf Indermaur (March 2, 1924 – March 17, 2005), was an Austrian journalist, television director, news editor, and politician. After a career as an officer in the German military, he became a journalist and also held political office. In der Maur served in the Landtag of Carinthia and was appointed by the Austrian parliament as the Federal Chancellor of the Commission for the Promotion of the Press. As a journalist, he was the editor of Wochenpresse and a radio director at ORF. In 1985 he was awarded the Decoration of Merit in Gold for the Republic of Austria.

== Early life and family ==
Wolf In der Maur was born on March 2, 1924, in Klagenfurt am Wörthersee, First Austrian Republic into the Tyrolese noble family In der Maur zu Strelburg und Freifeld. He was the son of Gilbert von In der Maur and Countess Maria Gertrude Valeska Rosa Aloisia Barbo von Waxenstein. His paternal grandfather was Carl von In der Maur. His maternal grandfather was Count Josef Anton Barbo von Waxenstein. He was the paternal great-grandson of Heinrich Ritter von Kogerer and maternal great-grandson of Count Joseph Emanuel Barbo von Waxenstein. In der Maur's parents later divorced and his mother remarried to Count Marino Pace von Friedensberg.

== Career ==
After graduating from his studies, In der Maur served from 1942 to 1945 in the German military war service as a lieutenant. After World War II he worked as a journalist, theater director, and a freelance employee at the Klagenfurt station. After 1945 he served in the Landtag of Carinthia. In 1947 he was a correspondent for various German and Austrian newspapers, later also publishing several industrial magazines. From 1949 to 1958 he was a public relations manager of the Dr. Hans Neuner shoe and leather factory in Klagenfurt.

He served as chief editor of the Wochenpresse from 1959 until 1961. In 1962 he began working for the newspaper Die Presse, where he became chief of the service, then managing director, and finally editor. In 1974, In der Maur moved to the ORF where he became the radio director under Otto Oberhammer. He next became the television director for FS 1 from 1979 to 1984. In 1977 he co-founded the Austrian Journalist Club with Günther Nenning.

In 1985 he was awarded the Decoration of Merit in Gold for the Republic of Austria.

In 1987 he served as the Federal Chancellor of the Austrian parliament's Commission for the Promotion of the Press.

== Personal life ==
In der Maur died on 17 March 2005, in Vienna.

== Publications ==
Some of In der Maur's publications include:

- Editor of the fiction series Kurz & Bündig
- Anton Pelinka and Erika Weinzierl (Editor): Austria's dealings with his past. Wien, 1997
- Michael-Gaismair-Gesellschaft (Editor): The man, the journalist, the historian. Bolzano, 1993. ISBN 88-7283-044-3
- Wolf In der Maur: Balkan. 1993, ISBN 3-85128-074-1
- Wolf In The Maur: Liberalism. 1990. ISBN 3-85128-048-2
- Wolf In der Maur: Nationalism. 1989. ISBN 3-85128-030-X
- Wolf In der Maur: The French Revolution. 1988. ISBN 3-85128-014-8
- Wolf In the Maur: Gypsy. Wanderer between the worlds. 1969. ISBN 3-85128-070-9
- Guido Zernatto: The essence of the nation. Questions and answers on the nationality problem. 1966
