= Barbo family =

Coat of arms of the Barbo family

The Barbo (Latin: Barbus) were Venetian patrician family prominent between the 14th and 16th centuries.

One branch, the Barbo von Waxenstein, settled in the Duchy of Carniola in the Holy Roman Empire in the late 15th century. They were raised to the rank of imperial counts by the Emperor Leopold II in 1674.

== Notable members ==
- Pantaleone Barbo (fl. 1363–1395), bailo of Corfu
- Ludovico Barbo (1381–1443), abbot of Santa Giustina
- Niccolò Barbo (d. 1462), humanist
- Paolo Barbo (1416–1462), diplomat and soldier in Venetian and papal service
- Pietro Barbo, elected Pope Paul II (r. 1464–1471)
- Marco Barbo (1420–1491), cardinal and patriarch of Aquileia
- Paolo Barbo (1423–1509), Venetian diplomat
- Giovanni Barbo, bishop of Pedena (r. 1526–1547)
