= Gilbert von In der Maur =

Austrian aristocrat and military officer

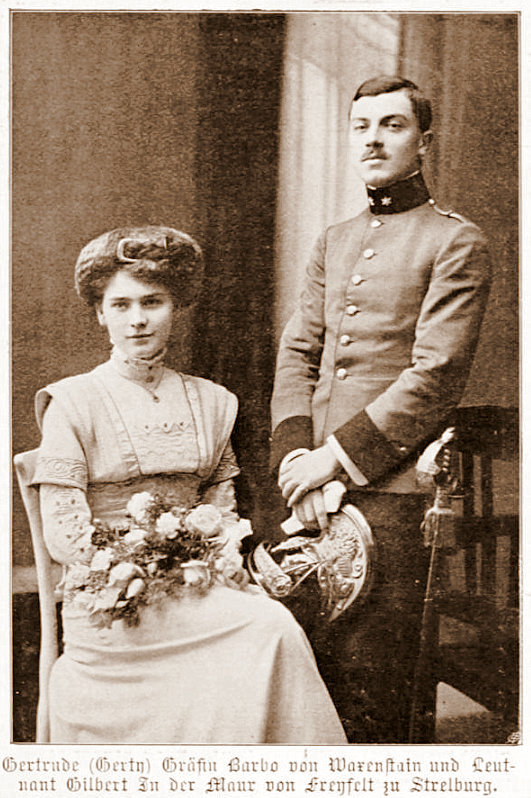
- In der Maur (right) and his first wife
- Born: Gilbert Heinrich Carl August von In der Maur auf Strelberg und zu Freifeld; 15 August 1887; Vaduz, Liechtenstein
- Died: 13 September 1959 (aged 72); Pörtschach am Wörthersee, Austria
- Noble family: In der Maur
- Spouses: Countess Maria Gertrude Valeska Rosa Aloisia Barbo von Waxenstein (?? - 1920; divorced); Margarethe Maria Anna Hatheyer
- Issue: Wolf In der Maur
- Father: Carl von In der Maur
- Mother: Auguste von Kogerer
- Occupation: Military officer, journalist

Gilbert Heinrich Carl August von In der Maur auf Strelberg und zu Freifeld (15 August 1887 – 13 September 1959), from 1919 Gilbert H. C. A. In der Maur was a Liechtenstein-born Austrian military officer, journalist and publicist. He also served as a government official of the Austrian National Socialist Party.

== Biography ==
Gilbert Heinrich Carl August von In der Maur auf Strelberg und zu Freifeld was born in Vaduz, Liechtenstein on 15 August 1887 to Carl von In der Maur and his wife, Auguste von Kogerer (1862-1916), daughter of Imperial and Royal Court Counselor Heinrich Ritter von Kogerer. He descended paternally from the old Tyrolese noble family In der Maur zu Strelburg und Freifeld. He was baptized in the Catholic faith on 24 August 1887. He served in the Austro-Hungarian Army during World War I and was severely wounded in 1914. He became a Rittmeister in the Austro-Hungarian Army in 1917.

From 1918 until 1933 he played an active role in the Anschluss movement, focused on Austria and Germany uniting to form a "Greater Germany", was a supporter of Austrian National Socialism and was a leading member of the Austrian Schutzstaffel as well as a member of the National Socialist Landesleitung, working alongside Josef Leopold. In July 1919 he went to Berlin as part of a Tyrolean delegation to discuss a potential German annexation of Austria. He considered Austria a "dictated" state, imposed upon Germanic people, preventing them from freely uniting with Germany.

In der Maur married Countess Maria Gertrude Valeska Rosa Aloisia Barbo von Waxenstein, the daughter of Count Josef Anton Barbo von Waxenstein. They had three children including Wolf-Bernhard Carl Borromaeus Paul Robert von In der Maur.

They divorced in 1920 and the Countess remarried Count Marino Pace von Friedensberg, a nephew of Anton Pace von Friedensberg and military comrade of In der Maur. In der Maur's daughter, Erika von In der Maur, adopted her stepfather's last name and became Erica Gräfin Pace von Friedensberg. He later married a second time to Margarethe Maria Anna Hatheyer and had more children.

In 1936 In der Maur authored the book Die Jugoslawen Einst Und Jetzt. Jugoslawiens Aussenpolitik on Yugoslavia and foreign policy. In the work, he compared the formation of the Yugoslav state to the unification of Germany.

From 1939 to 1945 he worked in the Defense Intelligence Agency in Vienna.

He died on 13 September 1959 in Pörtschach am Wörthersee.
