= Marco Bembo =

Marco Bembo was a Venetian diplomat and colonial official in the 1260s and 1270s.

Along with Pietro Zeno, he negotiated the ten-year peace treaty with the Byzantine emperor Michael VIII Palaiologos, signed at Constantinople on 4 April 1268. In 1269–1270 he served as one of the castellans of Coron, during which time he dealt with the murder of a Venetian archdeacon by a Byzantine sebastokrator (possibly the half-brother of the Emperor, Constantine), who had been captured on a ship off the Morea. In 1270–1271 he was Bailo of Constantinople, and in 1273–1274 Bailo of Negroponte. In 1275 he was sent on an embassy to Genoa with Giovanni Corner, and in the next year, he was sent to negotiate a new treaty with the Byzantine Emperor, along with Matteo Gradenigo. Gradenigo died during the long negotiations, and the two-year agreement was finally concluded by Bembo alone on 19 March 1277.

== See also ==
- Bembo (family)

== Sources ==
- Morgan, Gareth (1976). "The Venetian Claims Commission of 1278". Byzantinische Zeitschrift. 69 (2): 411–438. doi:10.1515/byzs.1976.69.2.411. S2CID 159571822.
- Nicol, Donald M. (1988). Byzantium and Venice: A Study in Diplomatic and Cultural Relations. Cambridge: Cambridge University Press. ISBN 0-521-34157-4.
