= Paolo Barbo =

Paolo Barbo or Paulus Barbus may refer to:

- Paolo Barbo (1416–1462), diplomat and soldier in Venetian and papal service
- Paolo Barbò da Soncino (died 1495), Lombard theologian
- Paolo Barbo (1423–1509), Venetian statesman
