= Dardo =

Dardo means dart in Italian, Portuguese and Spanish.

Dardo may also refer to:

- Dardo IFV, an Italian infantry fighting vehicle
- DARDO, an Italian close-in weapon system
- Dardo (automobile), a Brazilian sports car
- Tibetan name for the Chinese city of Kangding
- Italian destroyer Dardo, two destroyers built for the Italian navy
- Paul Jason Dardo, American drag queen known by the stage name Violet Chachki

== See also ==
- Darbo (disambiguation)
