= Darbo =

Darbo is a surname. Notable people with the surname include:

- Alieu Darbo (born 1992), Gambian footballer
- Arman Darbo (born 2001), French-American actor
- Clément Darbo (born 1986), French rugby union player
- Patrika Darbo (born 1948), née Davidson, American actress

== See also ==
- Dabo (disambiguation)
- Dardo (disambiguation)
- Barbo
