= Bailo of Corfu =

The Bailo of Corfu was the leader of the Venetian delegation to the island of Corfu who oversaw the affairs of the island while under Venetian rule and protected the commercial and military interests of the Republic of Venice. The first mention of a bailo in Corfu is in 1386 and is found in a Greek chronicle. The bailo of Corfu is also mentioned in a document by historian Marco Guazzo from 1544.

Amongst the Venetian provincial administrators, the Duke of Candia was the foremost, followed in order of seniority by the leaders of Negroponte, Corfu, Modon and Coron and Argos-Nauplion. The bailo of Corfu also administered the affairs of the Venetian dependencies of Butrinto and Lepanto in the mainland. Pantaleone Barbo was the first bailo of Corfu. The bailo of Corfu also made reports and recommendations to Venice regarding the construction of fortifications on the island.

== Historical background ==
To protect its military and commercial interests the Republic of Venice had established missions in key locations in the Ionian Sea and the Aegean. The Venetian missions were called reggimenti and their leaders were elected by the Senate of Venice or its Great Council. The leaders were elected for terms ranging between approximately 16 months to three years.

The general title of the leaders was Rettore, translated as rector. However the specific title awarded the rector varied depending on the location they administered. Thus in the Kingdom of Candia the leader was called Duca, in Zante the term was Conte and in Corfu the leader of the regiment was given the title of Bailo.

Being elected Rettore was an honour and established that the elected leader had the confidence of his peers in the Senate and Great Council and, although a mission in the overseas protectorates of Venice was expensive and dangerous, many Venetian noblemen lobbied for the position. Cuprus, Candia and possibly Corfu were considered the top locations of the Venetian realm.

The position of Bailo of Corfu was considered prestigious. In one occasion when Gian Matteo, after retiring as Rettore of Cattaro, lost the election to the position in Corfu, he was consoled by Pietro, a Venetian nobleman:

"God be praised that those who have taken away Corfu could not take away your virtue and valour. Perhaps this is for the best, so that you would not have to continually fight and defend yourself from Barbarossa."

== Communication with Venice ==
During the Ottoman invasion of Albania, the bailo of Corfu sent intelligence to the Venetian Senate advising them of the Ottoman gains after they took Rugina, known at the time as the "Lady of Valona", and Valona proper. The Venetians were very concerned about the Ottoman incursions which threatened the dominion and commerce of Venice and its dependencies in the Adriatic and the Strait of Otranto.

The bailo of Corfu also sent messages to Venice regarding his ideas about fortifications. In 1538 in one such message the bailo of Corfu remarked:

"[P]lease pay no attention to the last scheme forwarded to you by the military governor here, it is 'criticised by everyone' and I have had to dismiss the engineer Zanin 'who, though he seems stupid when he speaks, being from the Bergamasco, is in mind and deed full of excellent ideas and of sense and experience – but he does have the defect of being unable to communicate his ideas to anyone else ... Could we not have Michel [Michele Sanmicheli] ... who was so much praised by the late Duke of Urbino?'"

== Baili ==
This list is derived from Karl Hopf, Chroniques gréco-romanes inédites ou peu connues (Berlin: Weidmann, 1873), pp. 392–96.

In 1386, Venice was represented at Corfu by three provveditori: Michele Contarini, Saracino Dandolo and Marino Malipiero. There followed a series of baili that lasted down to the end of the republic:

- Pantaleone Barbo (1386–1387)
- Luigi Priuli (1387–1389)
- Pietro Vidorio (1389–1392)
- Simone Darmerio (1392–1394)
- Nicolo Zeno (1394–1396)
- Bernardo Foscarini (1396–1399)
- Marino di Luca Caravello (1399–1401)
- Giovanni Capello (1401–1403)
- Egidio Morosini (1403–1405)
- Nicolo Foscarini (1405–1407)
- Domenico Contarini (1407–1409)
- Michele Malipiero (1409–1410)
- Roberto Morosini da Santa Giustina (1410–1412)
- Ruggiero Contarini da San Canciano (1412–1413)
- Bernabo Loredano (1413–1415)
- Marino Bondumier (1415–1417)
- Nicolo Foscolo (1417–1419)
- Donato di Fantino Arimondo (1419–1421)
- Tommaso Minotto (1421–1423)
- Marco Miani (1423–1425)
- Marco Michieli (1425–1427)
- Lorenzo Venier da San Salvatore (1427–1428)
- Michele Duodo (1428–1430)
- Zaccaria Bembo (1430–1433)
- Omobuno Gritti (1433–1435)
- Giovanni Nani (1435–1438)
- Francesco Bono (1438–1440)
- Vidale Michieli (1440–1443)
- Pietro Bembo (1443–1445)
- Angelo Gradenigo (1445–1447)
- Giovanni di Daniele Loredano (1447–1450)
- Giorgio Bembo (1450–1453)
- Tommaso Minotto (1453–1456)
- Giovanni Gradenigo (1456–1459)
- Francesco Manolesso (1459–1462)
- Girolamo da Molin (1462–1465)
- Michele di Nicolò Trono (1465–1467)
- Tommaso Memo (1467–1469)
- Bernardo da Pesaro (1469–1470)
- Jacopo Quirini (1470–1472)
- Marco di Andrea Bembo (1472–1475)
- Pietro da Canale (1475–1478)
- Lorenzo da Lezze (1478–1479)
- Jacopo da Mosto (1479–1482)
- Nicolo Michieli (1482–1485)
- Ottaviano Buono (1485–1488)
- Baldassare Valaresso (1488–1489)
- Nicolo Pisani (1489–1492)
- Luigi Venier (1492–1494)
- Francesco Nani (1494–1497)
- Antonio Moro (1497–1499)
- Pietro Lioni (1499–1503)
- Antonio Loredano (1503)
- Nicolo Pisani (1503–1505)
- Giovanni Zentani (1505–1508)
- Antonio Morosini (1508–1509)
- Marco Zeno (1509–1512)
- Luigi Darmerio (1512–1515)
- Luigi Garzoni (1515–1517)
- Andrea Marcello (1517–1519)
- Bernardo Soranzo (1519–1523)
- Giustiniano Morosini (1523–1526)
- Gianluigi Soranzo (1526–1527)
- Nicolo da Ponte (1527–1534)
- Simeone Lioni (1534–1537)
- Stefano Tiepolo (1537–1539)
- Andrea Gritti (1539–1543)
- Almoro Morosini (1543–1544)
- Francesco Sanudo (1544–1546)
- Giovanni da Pesaro (1546–1547)
- Luigi Gritti (1547–1549)
- Girolamo Bragadino (1549–1550)
- Donato Malipiero (1550–1552)
- Luigi da Riva (1552–1554)
- Antonio Barbarigo (1554)
- Zaccaria Morosini (1554–1556)
- Bernardo Sagredo (1556–1558)
- Francesco Duodo (1558–1560)
- Nicolo Dandolo (1560–1562)
- Agostino Sanudo (1562–1564)
- Girolamo Lando (1564–1566)
- Lorenzo Bernardo (1566–1568)
- Nadale Donato (1568–1570)
- Francesco Cornaro (1570–1571)
- Francesco Gritti (1571–1574)
- Giovanni Mocenigo (1574–1577)
- Pietro Pisani (1577–1579)
- Agostino Moro (1579–1581)
- Andrea Navagero (1581–1583)
- Girolamo Capella (1583–1585)
- Antonio Foscarini (1585–1589)
- Bartolommeo Moro (1589–1590)
- Jacopo da Pesaro (1590–1592)
- Marco Loredano (1592–1594)
- Giovanni Sagredo (1594–1596)
- Dolfino Venier (1596–1598)
- Matteo Girardo (1598–1600)
- Lenoardo Giuliano (1600–1602)
- Zaccaria Gabriel (1602–1604)
- Giovanni Lioni (1604–1606)
- Luigi Basadonna (1606–1608)
- Nadale Donato (1608–1610)
- Luigi Bragadino (1610–1612)
- Angelo Gabriel (1612–1614)
- Lorenzo Contarini (1614–1616)
- Girolamo Loredano (1616–1618)
- Andrea Bragadino (1618–1620)
- Antonio Loredano (1620–1622)
- Pietro Marcello (1622–1624)
- Lancelotto Mario Gabriel (1624–1626)
- Marcantonio Malipiero (1626–1629)
- Giovanni Priuli (1629–1631)
- Domenico Minio (1631–1633)
- Girolamo Premarino (1633–1635)
- Tommaso Morosini (1635)
- Bernardo Morosini (1635–1637)
- Girolamo Morosini (1637–1639)
- Antonio Girardo (1639–1641)
- Cipriano Civrano (1641–1643)
- Michele Malipiero (1643–1646)
- Girolamo Foscarini (1646–1648)
- Antonio Quirini (1648–1650)
- Giovanni Bembo (1650–1652)
- Francesco Orio (1652–1654)
- Paolo Donato (1654–1656)
- Giovanni Quirini (1656–1658)
- Marino Badoer (1658–1660)
- Antonio Lombardo (1660–1663)
- Antonio da Mosto (1663–1666)
- Almoro Barbaro (1666–1667)
- Giorgio Baffo (1667–1670)
- Giovanni da Mosto (1670–1672)
- Luigis Contarini (1672–1674)
- Bartolommeo Vitturi (1674–1676)
- Marco Balbi (1676–1678)
- Girolamo Morosini (1678–1680)
- Giovanni Badoer (1680–1682)
- Jacopo da Pesaro (1682–1684)
- Giovanni Balbi (1684–1686)
- Leonardo Bono (1686–1689)
- Giorgio Quirini (1689–1691)
- Giovanni Quirini (1691–1694)
- Francesco Semitecolo (1694–1695)
- Giulio Balbi (1695–1697)
- Giambattista Loredano (1697–1699)
- Antonio Foscarini (1699–1701)
- Bernardino Semitecolo (1701–1703)
- Marcantonio Trevisano (1703–1706)
- Giovanni Foscarini (1706–1707)
- Benetto Bollani (1707–1709)
- Pietro Loredano (1709–1711)
- Pietro Donato (1711–1713)
- Iseppo Barbaro (1713–1716)
- Nicolò Foscari (1716–1720)
- Zaccaria Bembo (1720–1722)
- Francesco Badoer (1722–1724)
- Francesco Semitecolo (1724–1726)
- Giovannadrea Pasqualigo (1726–1728)
- Alberto Donato (1728–1730)
- Marino Minio (1730–1732)
- Pietro Balbi (1732–1733)
- Giulio Balbi (1733–1734)
- Daniele Lodovico Balbi (1734–1736)
- Girolamo Bonlini (1736–1741)
- Nicolò Venier (1741–1743)
- Gianfrancesco Sagredo (1743–1745)
- Lucio Antono Balbi (1745–1747)
- Franceso Soranzo (1747–1749)
- Marco Marin (1749–1751)
- Vincenzo Longo (1751–1753)
- Giambattista Lippomano (1753–1755)
- Franceso Antonio Barbo (1755–1758)
- Alessandro Simitecolo (1758–1760)
- Francesco Diedo (1760–1762)
- Gianluigi Maria Donato (1762–1764)
- Giorgio Loredano (1764–1766)
- Nicolò Soranzo (1766–1768)
- Alessandro Bollani (1768–1770)
- Francesco Soranzo (1770–1772)
- Angelo Maria Giorgio (1772–1775)
- Alessandro Morosini (1775–1777)
- Luigi Antonio Condulmer (1777–1779)
- Andrea Bono (1779–1781)
- Giorgio Marin (1781–1782)
- Carlo Giorgio (1782–1784)
- Barbarigo Riva (1784–1786)
- Paolo Antonio Condulmer (1786–1788)
- Giorgio Barozzi (1788–1790)
- Jacopo Soranzo (1790–1792)
- Carlo Balbi (1792–1794)
- Giovan Carlo Maria Giorgio (1794–1796)
- Domenico Zeno (1796–1797)

== See also ==
- Bailo of Constantinople
- Bailo of Negroponte
- Stato da Màr
