= Pope Innocent VIII =

Head of the Catholic Church from 1484 to 1492

- Bishop of Rome
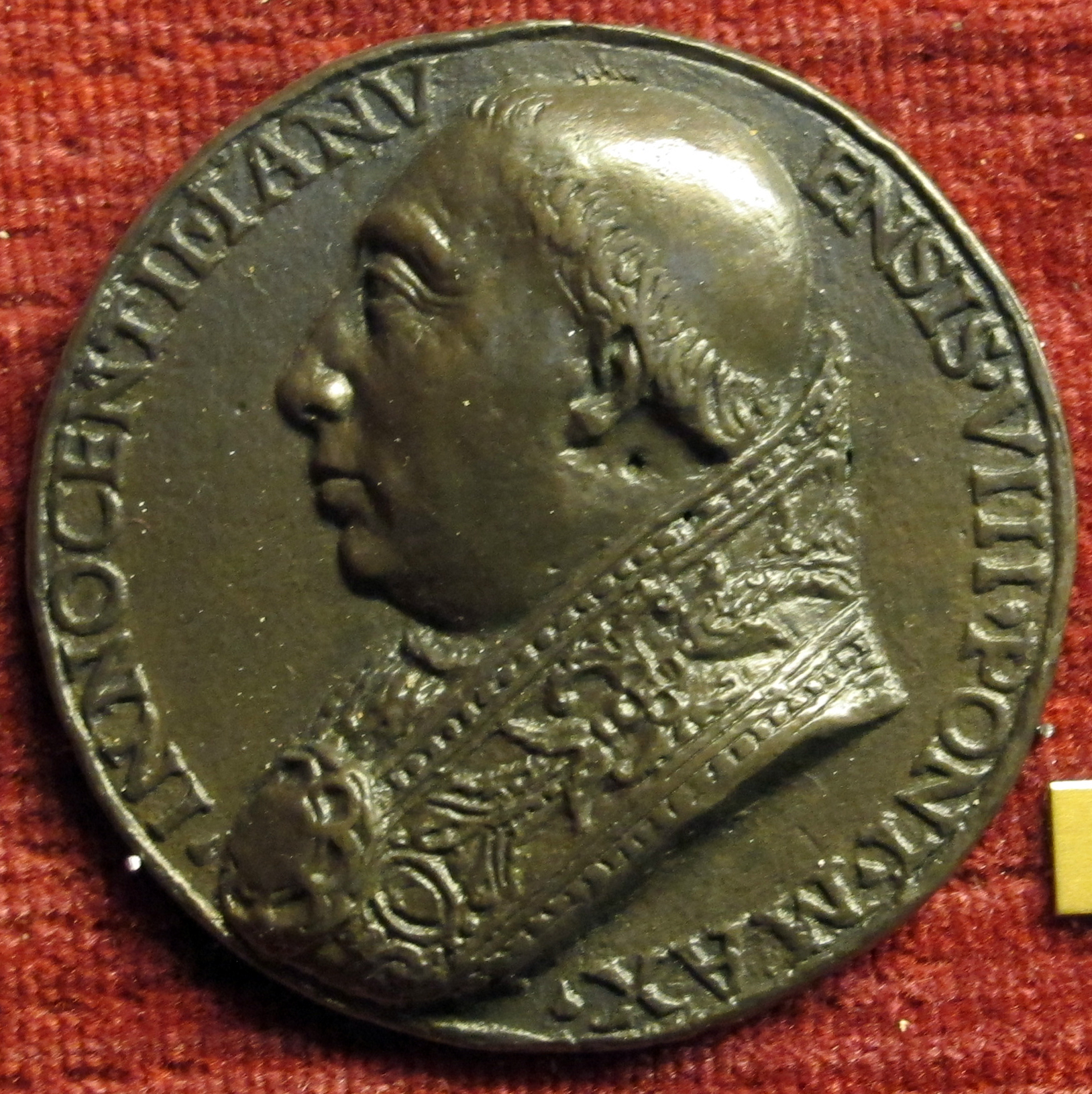
- Innocent VIII in a medal designed by Niccolò di Forzore Spinelli
- Church: Catholic Church
- Papacy began: 29 August 1484
- Papacy ended: 25 July 1492
- Predecessor: Sixtus IV
- Successor: Alexander VI
- Previous posts: Bishop of Savona (1466–1472); Bishop of Molfetta (1472–1484); Cardinal-Priest of Santa Balbina (1473–1474); Cardinal-Priest of Santa Cecilia (1474–1484); Camerlengo of the College of Cardinals (1482; 1484)

Orders
- Ordination: c. 1450
- Consecration: 28 January 1467
- Created cardinal: 7 May 1473 by Sixtus IV

Personal details
- Born: Giovanni Battista Cybo (or Cibo); 5 November 1432 Genoa, Republic of Genoa
- Died: 25 July 1492 (aged 59–60) Rome, Papal States
- Children: Franceschetto Cybo; Teodorina Cybo
- Coat of arms

Papal styles of Pope Innocent VIII
- Reference style: His Holiness
- Spoken style: Your Holiness
- Religious style: Holy Father
- Posthumous style: None

Pope Innocent VIII (Latin: Innocentius VIII; Italian: Innocenzo VIII; 1432 – 25 July 1492), born Giovanni Battista Cybo (or Cibo), was head of the Catholic Church and leader of the Papal States from 29 August 1484 to his death, in July 1492. Son of the viceroy of Naples, Cybo spent his early years at the Neapolitan court. He became a priest in the retinue of Cardinal Calandrini, half-brother to Pope Nicholas V (1447–55); Bishop of Savona under Pope Paul II; and with the support of Cardinal Giuliano Della Rovere he was made a cardinal by Pope Sixtus IV. After intense politicking by Della Rovere, Cybo was elected pope in 1484. King Ferdinand I of Naples had supported Cybo's competitor, Rodrigo Borgia. The following year, Pope Innocent supported the barons in their failed revolt.

During his papacy, Pope Innocent issued a papal bull on witchcraft named Summis desiderantes affectibus. In March 1489, Cem, the captive brother of Bayezid II, the sultan of the Ottoman Empire, came into Innocent's custody. Viewing his brother as a rival, the Sultan paid Pope Innocent not to set him free. The amount he paid to Pope Innocent was 120,000 crowns (an amount equal to all of the annual revenue to the Vatican) in addition to some holy relics and another sum of money to be paid annually. Any time the Sultan threatened war against the Christian Balkans, Innocent threatened to release his brother. On 28 January 1495, Cem was released by Innocent's successor, Pope Alexander VI, into the custody of the army of King Charles VIII of France.

== Early years ==
In 1432, Giovanni Battista Cybo was born in Genoa, the son of Arano Cybo and wife Teodorina de Mari. His father was from an old Genoese family of Greek ancestry, a viceroy of Naples and then a senator in Rome under Pope Calixtus III. Giovanni Battista's early years were spent at the Neapolitan court. While in Naples he was appointed a Canon of the Cathedral of Capua, and was given the Priory of Santa Maria d'Arba in Genoa. After the death of King Alfonso (1458), friction between Giovanni Battista and the Archbishop of Genoa induced him to resign his canonry, and to go to Padua and then to Rome for his education.

== Early career ==
In Rome he became a priest in the retinue of Cardinal Calandrini, half-brother to Pope Nicholas V (1447–55). In 1467, he was made Bishop of Savona by Pope Paul II, but exchanged this see in 1472 for that of Molfetta in south-eastern Italy. In 1473, with the support of Giuliano Della Rovere, later Pope Julius II, he was made cardinal by Pope Sixtus IV, whom he succeeded on 29 August 1484 as Pope Innocent VIII.

== Papal election ==
The papal conclave of 1484 was rife with factions, while gangs rioted in the streets. In order to prevent the election of the Venetian Cardinal Barbo, Camerlengo of the Sacred College of Cardinals, on the evening before the election, after the cardinals had retired for the night, the Dean of the College of Cardinals, Cardinal Giuliano della Rovere, nephew of the late Pope, and Cardinal Borgia, the Vice-Chancellor, visited a number of cardinals and secured their votes with the promise of various benefices.

It was claimed that Cardinal della Rovere met secretly with Cardinal Marco Barbo in order to secure him more votes to become pope if he was promised a residence, though Barbo refused in fear it would make the conclave invalid due to simony. Cardinal della Rovere then met with Borgia, who disliked Barbo and wished to block his election, with an offer to turn their votes over to Cybo, promising them benefits for doing so.

== Papacy ==
Shortly after his investiture, Innocent VIII addressed a fruitless summons to Christendom to unite in a crusade against the Turks. A protracted conflict with King Ferdinand I of Naples was the principal obstacle. Ferdinand's oppressive government led in 1485 to a rebellion of the aristocracy, known as the Conspiracy of the Barons, which included Francesco Coppola and Antonello Sanseverino of Salerno and was supported by Pope Innocent VIII. Innocent excommunicated Ferdinand in 1489 and invited King Charles VIII of France to come to Italy with an army and take possession of the Kingdom of Naples. (Note: Mallet and Shaw state that Ferdinand was deposed by Innocent VIII.) (Note: Watkins states Ferdinand's excommunication was included with other named nobles and that Ferdinand was deposed later in the same month by a Papal bull.) The immediate conflict was not ended until 1494, after Innocent VIII's death.

=== Relations with the Ottoman Empire ===
Bayezid II ruled as Sultan of the Ottoman Empire from 1481 to 1512. His rule was contested by his brother Cem, who sought the support of the Mamluks of Egypt. Defeated by his brother's armies, Cem sought protection from the Knights of St. John in Rhodes. Prince Cem offered perpetual peace between the Ottoman Empire and Christendom. However, the sultan paid the Knights a large amount to keep Cem captive. Cem was later sent to the castle of Pierre d'Aubusson in France. Sultan Bayezid sent a messenger to France and requested Cem to be kept there; he agreed to make an annual payment in gold for his brother's expenses.

In March 1489, Cem was transferred to the custody of Innocent VIII. Cem's presence in Rome was useful because whenever Bayezid intended to launch a military campaign against the Christian nations of the Balkans, the Pope would threaten to release his brother. In exchange for maintaining the custody of Cem, Bayezid paid Innocent VIII 120,000 crowns, a relic of the Holy Lance and an annual fee of 45,000 ducats. Cem died in Capua on 25 February 1495 on a military expedition under the command of King Charles VIII of France to conquer Naples.

=== Relations with witchcraft ===
On the request of German inquisitor Heinrich Kramer, Innocent VIII issued the papal bull Summis desiderantes affectibus (5 December 1484), which supported Kramer's investigations against magicians and witches:

"It has recently come to our ears, not without great pain to us, that in some parts of upper Germany, [...] Mainz, Köln, Trier, Salzburg, and Bremen, many persons of both sexes, heedless of their own salvation and forsaking the catholic faith, give themselves over to devils male and female, and by their incantations, charms, and conjurings, and by other abominable superstitions and sortileges, offences, crimes, and misdeeds, ruin and cause to perish the offspring of women, the foal of animals, the products of the earth, the grapes of vines, and the fruits of trees, as well as men and women, cattle and flocks and herds and animals of every kind, vineyards also and orchards, meadows, pastures, harvests, grains and other fruits of the earth; [...]."

The bull was written in response to the request of Dominican Heinrich Kramer for explicit authority to prosecute witchcraft in Germany, after he was refused assistance by the local ecclesiastical authorities, who disputed his authority to work in their dioceses. Some scholars view the bull as "clearly political", motivated by jurisdictional disputes between the local German Catholic priests and clerics from the Office of the Inquisition who answered more directly to the pope.

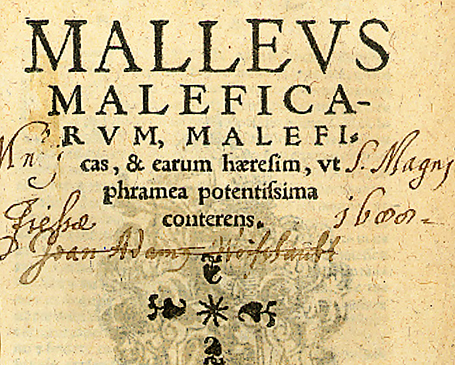
Malleus Maleficarum, 1520 edition

Nonetheless, the bull failed to ensure that Kramer obtained the support he had hoped for, causing him to retire and to compile his views on witchcraft into his book Malleus Maleficarum, which was published in 1487. Kramer would later claim that witchcraft was to blame for bad weather. Both the papal letter appended to the work and the supposed endorsement of Cologne University for it are problematic. The letter of Innocent VIII is not an approval of the book to which it was appended, but rather a charge to inquisitors to investigate diabolical sorcery and a warning to those who might impede them in their duty, that is, a papal letter in the by then conventional tradition established by John XXII and other popes through Eugenius IV and Nicholas V (1447–55).

=== Other events ===
In 1487, Innocent confirmed Tomas de Torquemada as Grand Inquisitor of Spain. Also in 1487, Innocent issued a bull Id Nostri Cordis denouncing the views of the Waldensians (Vaudois), offering plenary indulgence to all who should engage in a Crusade against them. Alberto de' Capitanei, archdeacon of Cremona, responded to the bull by organizing a crusade to fulfill its order and launched an offensive in the provinces of Dauphiné and Piedmont. Charles I, Duke of Savoy eventually interfered to save his territories from further confusion and promised the Vaudois peace, but not before the offensive had devastated the area and many of the Vaudois fled to Provence and south to Italy.

The noted Franciscan theologian Angelo Carletti di Chivasso, whom Innocent in 1491 appointed as Apostolic Nuncio and Commissary, conjointly with the Bishop of Mauriana, was involved in reaching the peaceful agreement between Catholics and Waldensians.

In 1486, Innocent VIII was persuaded that at least thirteen of the 900 theses of Giovanni Pico della Mirandola were heretical, and the book containing the theses was interdicted.

In Rome, he ordered the Belvedere of the Vatican to be built, intended for summer use, on an unarticulated slope above the Vatican Palace. His successor would later turn the building into the Cortile del Belvedere. In season, he hunted at Castello della Magliana, which he enlarged. Constantly confronted with a depleted treasury, he resorted to the objectionable expedient of creating new offices and granting them to the highest bidders. The fall of Granada in January 1492, was celebrated in the Vatican and Innocent granted Ferdinand II of Aragon the epithet "Catholic Majesty."

=== Slavery ===
It was noted that the attitude of Renaissance popes towards slavery, a common institution worldwide in contemporary cultures, varied. Minnich states that those who allowed the slave trade did so in the hope of gaining converts to Christianity. In the case of Innocent he permitted trade with Barbary merchants in which foodstuffs would be given in exchange for slaves who could then be converted to Christianity.

King Ferdinand of Aragon gave Innocent 100 Moorish slaves, who were shared out with favoured Cardinals. The slaves of Innocent were called mori, meaning "dark-skinned men", in contrast to negro slaves who were called mori neri, meaning "black moors".

=== Canonizations ===
In 1484, Innocent granted formal approval for the local veneration of Catherine of Vadstena, recognizing her cult and affirming her status within the traditions of regional religious devotion—a significant step toward legitimizing her sanctity within the broader framework of the Catholic Church. In 1485, at Emperor Frederick III's request, Innocent canonized Leopold III.

=== Consistories ===
Innocent VIII named eight cardinals in one consistory which was held on 9 March 1489; the pope named three of those cardinals in pectore (one of whom being a successor in Giovanni de' Medici who became Pope Leo X) with two of them having their names released after the pope died to ensure that they could vote in the 1492 conclave.

== Death ==
By July 1492, Innocent had an abnormally small weight. To Filippo Valori, he had become 'an inert mass of flesh, incapable of assimilating any nourishment but a few drops of milk from a young woman's breast'. He then soon developed a fever and died. A possibly apocryphal story stated that Innocent's physician drew the blood from three young boys to transfuse it into the Pope but the treatment failed and all four involved died.

=== Tomb ===
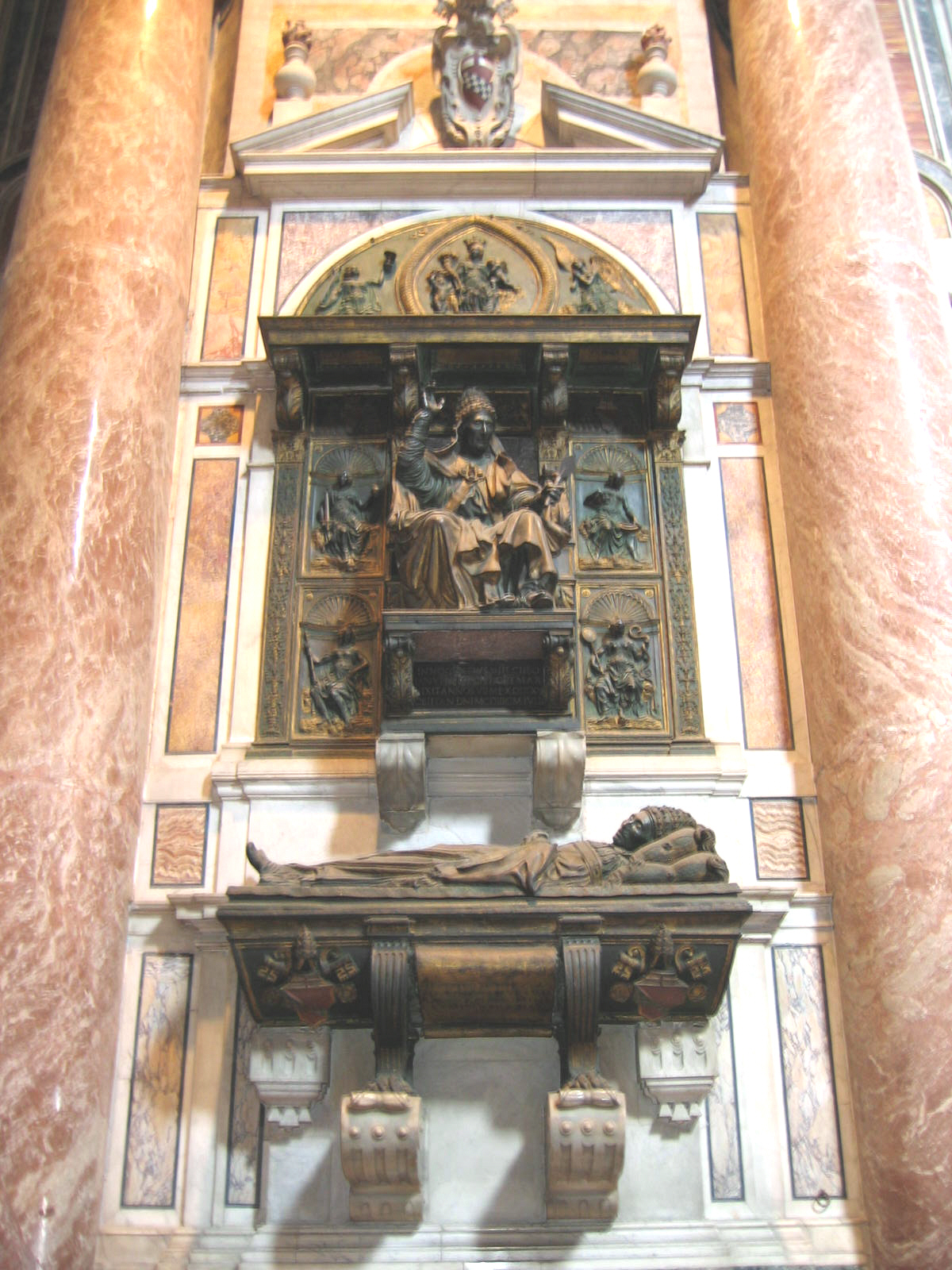
Monument to Innocentius VIII in Saint Peter's Basilica

Innocent was first buried in the Oratory of Our Lady in Old St. Peter's Basilica. The tomb was crafted by Antonio del Pollaiuolo, who completed the work shortly before his own death in February 1498. Around 1507 it was moved to the "Shroud" aisle adjacent to the Chapel of the Holy Lance.

The inscription below his tomb in Saint Peter's states: "Nel tempo del suo Pontificato, la gloria della scoperta di un nuovo mondo" (transl. "During his Pontificate, the glory of the discovery of a new world."). Writer Ruggero Marino, in his book Cristoforo Colombo e il Papa tradito (transl. Christopher Columbus and the betrayed Pope) argues that since Innocent died shortly before the departure of Christopher Columbus on his presumedly first voyage over the Atlantic, this suggests that Columbus actually traveled before the known date and re-discovered the Americas for the Europeans before the supposed date of 12 October 1492.

At some point the pope's coat of arms was replaced with an inscription, and the position of the two images of Innocent switched. After completion of the nave of the new basilica, in 1621 the monument was dismantled and relocated courtesy of Innocent's great nephew, Alberico Cybo Malaspina, prince of Massa, duke of Ferentillo, and marquis of Carrara.

"The monument does have some historical inaccuracies, as already widely noted by the critics...": "Ciibo" instead of "Cibo", "vixit" instead of "sedit", the date of death as "1497" instead of "1492", a reference to the "Crucis Ssancro Santi; in addition, a reference to Bayezid as Imper(atore) scratched out and replaced with "Tyrant", any of which could have taken place during the reconstruction.

== Family ==
Innocent had at least seven illegitimate children born before he entered the clergy. Only two of them, a son and a daughter, were recognized and legitimized, "towards whom his nepotism had been as lavish as it was shameless". In 1487, he married his elder son Franceschetto Cybo (d. 1519) to Maddalena de' Medici (1473–1528), the daughter of Lorenzo de' Medici, who in return obtained the cardinal's hat for his 13-year-old son Giovanni, later Pope Leo X. His daughter Teodorina Cybo married Gerardo Usodimare and had a son, Aranino Cybo (father of Gherardo Cybo), and two daughters: Battistina Usodimare, who married Luigi d'Aragona, and Peretta Usodimare (Rome, 1478–Genoa, 3 December 1550), who married firstly Alfonso I del Carretto, and secondly Andrea Doria. Savonarola chastised him for his worldly ambitions.

His grandnephew Bindo Altoviti was one of the most influential bankers of his time and a notable patron of the arts, being friends with Raphael and Michelangelo.

== See also ==
- Cardinals created by Innocent VIII

== Sources ==
- Black Africans in Renaissance Europe, N. H. Minnich, Thomas Foster Earle, K. J. P. Lowe, Cambridge University Press, 2005, ISBN 0-521-81582-7
- For the glory of God: how monotheism led to reformations, science, witch-hunts, and the end of slavery, Rodney Stark, p. 330, Princeton University Press, 2003, ISBN 0-691-11436-6
- The problem of slavery in Western culture, David Brion Davis, Oxford University Press US, 1988, ISBN 0-19-505639-6
- Bizzocchi, Roberto (1995). Genealogie incredibili scritti di storia nell'Europa moderna (in Italian). Società editrice il Mulino.
- Mallett, Michael; Shaw, Christine (2012). The Italian Wars, 1494-1559. Pearson Education Limited. ISBN 978-0-582-05758-6.
- Watkins, Robert Dorsey (1927). The State as a Party Litigant. The Johns Hopkins University Press.
- Williams, George L. (1998). Papal Genealogy: The Families and Descendants of the Popes. McFarland.
- "The Problem of Slavery in Western Culture – Paperback – David Brion Davis – Oxford University Press". Oup.com. 20 October 1988. Archived from the original on 4 February 2013.
- Doubts over the finding of the Santa Maria of Colombo, Nicolò Carnimeo, IlFattoQuotidiano.it, 2014

Catholic Church titles
Preceded by Giovanni Arcimboldi	Camerlengo of the Sacred College of Cardinals; 1484	Succeeded by Giovanni Michiel
Preceded by Sixtus IV	Pope; 29 August 1484 – 25 July 1492	Succeeded by Alexander VI
