= Canons Regular of San Giorgio in Alga =

Influential group of Italian canons regular

The Canons Regular of San Giorgio in Alga (Congregatio Canonicorum Sancti Georgii in Alga Venetiarum) were a congregation of canons regular which was influential in the reform movement of monastic life in northern Italy during the 15th and 16th centuries.

== History ==
Its roots lay in the preaching of an itinerant canon regular, Bartolomeo of Rome, who was a proponent of the new spirituality of the Devotio Moderna which had developed in the Low Countries and was starting to spread in northern Italy. While ministering in Venice in 1396 he met two young noblemen, Gabriele Condulmer (the future Pope Eugene IV) and his cousin, Antonio Correr, the nephew of Cardinal Angelo Correr, soon elected as Pope Gregory XII. Under his inspiration, the cousins decided to give up their wealth and to lead lives of prayer and service. In 1400 they began to live together as a small religious community, modeled on the Brothers of the Common Life, following the Rule of St. Augustine. They lived in a house lent to them by a relative.

One of the first men to join them there was Lawrence Giustiniani, who was a deacon at the time, the first cleric of the small community. In 1404 they were given the use of a monastery of Augustinian friars on the isolated island of St. George in Alga, which was almost empty, by its commendatory prior, a young nobleman, Ludovico Barbo, who soon himself joined the community. The new monastery quickly grew to have 17 members, all members of the clergy by then, and received the approval of Pope Boniface IX on 30 November of that year.

Though essentially contemplative in their way of life, some of the canons did undertake a limited active Christian ministry. The provost of the community was elected annually up to that point. Nevertheless, they successfully combined aspects of prayer, a simple lifestyle and solitude with the solemn celebration of the liturgy. In 1444, San Giorgio in Braida, Verona was made a dependency of San Giorgio in Alga. In 1462 they acquired the Chiesa della Madonna dell'Orto which had previously belonged to the Humiliati. In 1482 San Pietro in Oliveto in Brescia was transferred from the Benedictines to the Canons of San Giorgio. During its reconstruction in 1508, the canons held a solemn procession translating the relics of San Silvino, an early bishop of Brescia, from the Duomo to San Pietro.

They enjoyed a reputation for both simplicity and dedication and appear to have achieved the canonical idea of fidelity to the life of an enclosed religious order without religious vows, which were not introduced until 1568. Before this time, they were therefore a congregation of secular canons. The canons wore a white habit with a blue cloak.

The success of the community led to the adoption of their way of life by a large number of communities of canons in the region, leading to the formation of a new congregation of canons. Giustiniani spent many years at the Priory of St. Augustine in Vicenza, and assisted in numerous other foundations until he was named a bishop. In 1408 Pope Gregory appointed Barbo to be the abbot of the Benedictine Abbey of Santa Giustina in Padua, which he reformed with help of two monks, two Camaldolese novices and three canons of San Giorgio in Alga. At that point Barbo became a Benedictine monk. Through his leadership, the life of the abbey was dramatically revived and eventually became the center of the Congregation of Santa Giustina, which became an important center of reform of Benedictine monasteries in Italy.

In 1424 the canons elected their first Superior General to oversee the houses of their burgeoning congregation. Pope Gregory XII called his nephew Antonio Correr and Gabriele Condulmer to Rome to serve as cardinals. Condulmer later became Pope Eugene IV and Giustiniani became the first Patriarch of Venice, promoting the reform of the city and the spread of the Gospel throughout his episcopate. Like the Theatines in the 16th century, this congregation enjoyed much more influence and importance than its size would suggest.

For these canons, the 15th century was their high point, however. By the 17th century, the congregation had entered a period of decay. Vocations and the level of dedication to the life declined. Finally, in 1688, the monastery of San Giorgio was suppressed and its property was confiscated and sold off to raise money for the defense of the Republic of Venice against the Ottoman Empire.

The Secular Canons of St. John the Evangelist adopted the dress and statutes of the canons of San Giorgio.
