= Dabo =

Dabo may refer to:

- Dabo (Star Trek), a fictional game of chance
- Dabo, Indonesia, a port in Indonesia
  - Dabo Airport, an airport in Dabo, Indonesia
- Dabo, Mali, a commune in Mali
- Dabo, Moselle, a commune of the Moselle département, France
- Dabo (mountain) (647 m), a mountain in the Vosges, France

== People ==
- Ibrahim Dabo (19th century), ruler of Kano and founder of the Dabo dynasty
- Baciro Dabó (1958–2009), Guinea-Bissauan politician
- Dabo Swinney (born 1969), American football coach
- Dabo (rapper) (born 1975), Japanese hip-hop artist
- Ousmane Dabo (born 1977), French footballer
- Mouhamadou Dabo (born 1986), French footballer
- Bagaliy Dabo (born 1988), French footballer
- Fankaty Dabo (born 1995), English footballer

== See also ==
- Darbo (disambiguation)
- Dabotap, pagoda located in Bulguk Temple in Gyeongju, South Korea
