= San Giorgio in Alga =

Island in the Venetian Lagoon

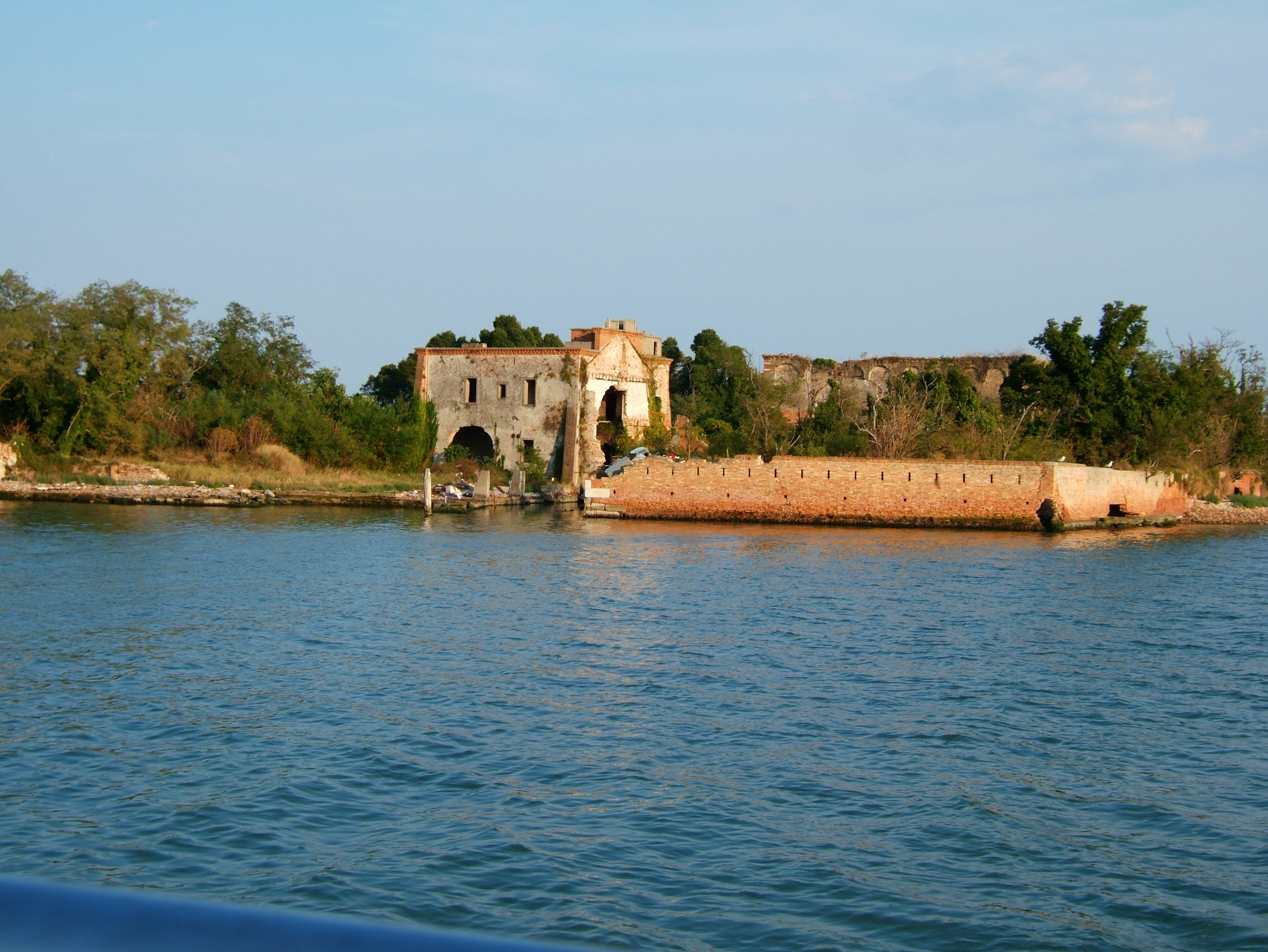
- The island of San Giorgio in Alga, seen from the lagoon

- Location within Venetian Lagoon

Geography
- Coordinates: 45.425°N 12.291944°E
- Adjacent to: Venetian Lagoon

Administration
- Italy
- Region: Veneto
- Province: Province of Venice

San Giorgio in Alga (English: "St. George in the seaweed") is an island of the Venetian lagoon, northern Italy, lying between the Giudecca and Fusina (a frazione of Venice on the coast, near Marghera).

== History ==
After a Benedictine monastery was founded about 1000 AD, more monasteries followed. In 1404, Ludovico Barbo, the commendatory prior of a monastery of Augustinian friars on the island which was almost abandoned, gave the monastery to a small community of canons leading a contemplative life. The canons of the monastery instituted reforms to the canonical life which were quickly adopted in other communities of canons throughout the region. Soon they became the head of a congregation known as the Canons Regular of San Giorgio in Alga. One of Barbo's reforms was to allow the canons to sleep in separate cells to provide more opportunity for solitary prayer.

In 1717 a fire burnt most of the buildings on the island. As of 1799 there was a political prison, but nowadays the island is completely abandoned.

The island was used in 1944 as a secret base for German military personnel training as free-diving frogmen to master mine laying against Allied ships. To avoid being discovered they practised only at night.
