= Bailo =

Venetian title

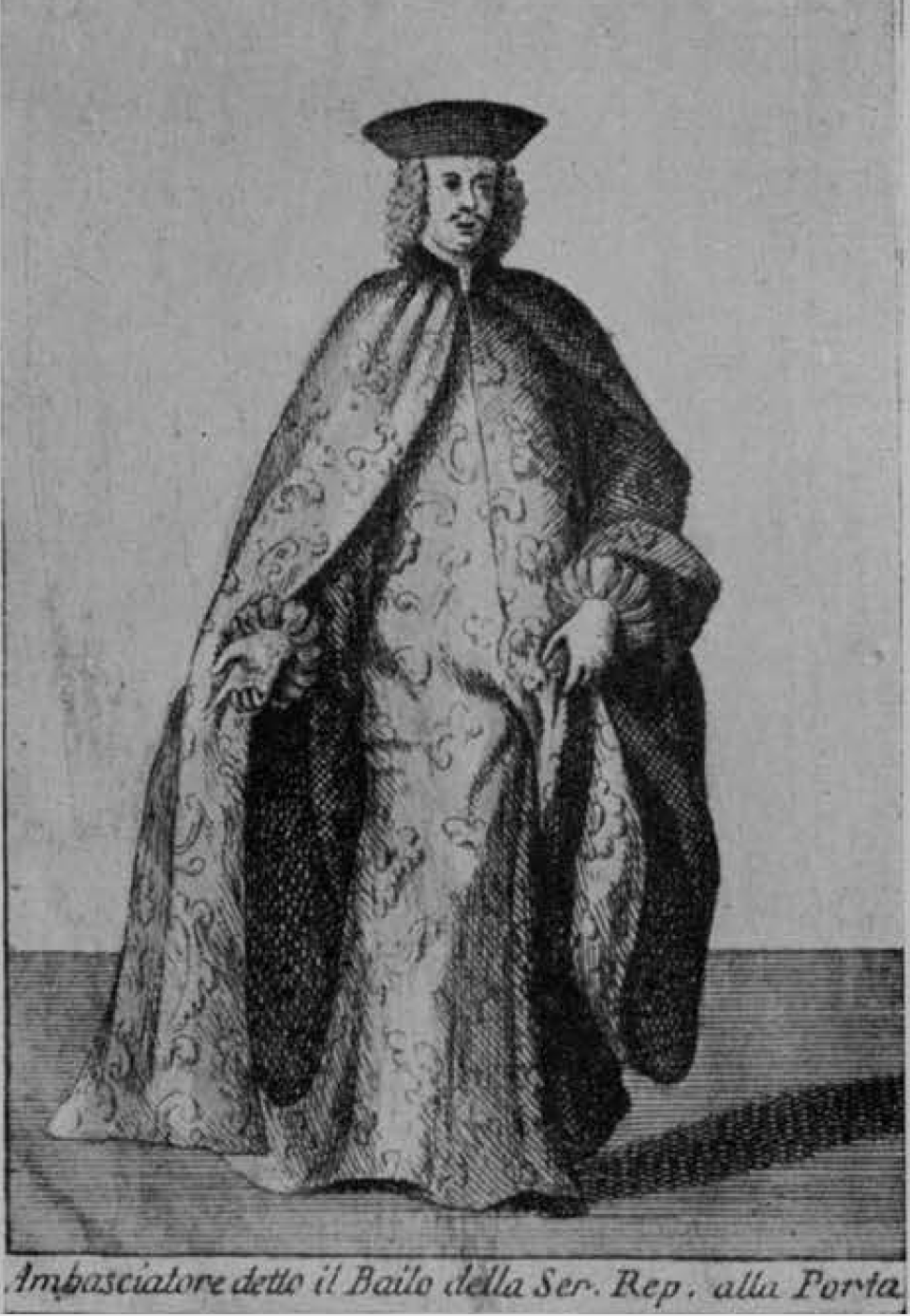
Bailo

Bailo or baylo (plural baili or bayli) is a Venetian title that derives from the Latin term baiulus, meaning "porter, bearer". In English, it may be translated bailiff, or otherwise rendered as bailey, baili, bailie, bailli or baillie. The office of a bailo is a bailaggio (sometimes anglicised "bailate"). The term was transliterated into Greek as μπαΐουλος (baioulos), but Nicephorus Gregoras translated it ἐπίτροπος (epitropos, steward) or ἔφορος (ephoros, overseer).

In the Middle Ages, a bailo was a resident ambassador of the Republic of Venice. The most famous baili were those at Constantinople, who were, from 1268, the Venetian ambassadors to the Byzantine court and, after 1453, to the Ottoman government. There were also permanent baili at Negroponte, Durazzo and Corfu. Baili were also sent to represent Venetian interests at the courts of Cyprus, Acre (Jerusalem), Armenia and Trebizond. In the mid-thirteenth century, the Venetian consuls in Tyre and Tripoli in the kingdom of Acre were upgraded to the rank of bailo. Venice also sent baili to oversee its colonies at Aleppo, Antivari, Koroni, Modon, Nauplia, Patras and Tenedos.

The term baiulus was first used in Venetian documents translated from Arabic in the twelfth century. It was originally used to refer to Muslim officials, but in the thirteenth century came to be applied to special envoys sent by Venice to govern its colonies in Frankish Greece. These governors doubled as diplomats. They operated courts for the Venetian colonists, collected taxes and customs dues and supervised Venetian trade. Each was assisted by a chancery (run by a chancellor) and a Council of Twelve, composed of the leading men of the colony and modeled on the Council of Ten in Venice. Each had a chaplain, a physician and an interpreter (or dragoman). Each sent back regular reports to Venice on the local politics, the affairs of the colony and, most importantly, the prices and quantities of goods in the local market. He was the superior of the consuls operating in the same country.

By the end of the 15th century, the office of bailo had mostly disappeared, with those operating on foreign soil being downgraded to consuls and those governing Venetian territories being termed rectors, captains or podestà. The bailates of Constantinople and Corfu, however, survived until the end of the republic in 1797.

== See also ==
- Bailo of Constantinople
- Bailo of Negroponte
- Bailo of Corfu
