= Ludovico Barbo =

Most Reverend Lodovico Barbo
- Bishop of Treviso
- Church: Catholic Church
- Diocese: Diocese of Treviso
- In office: 1437–1443
- Successor: Ermolao Barbaro the Elder

Personal details
- Died: Sep 1443 Treviso, Italy

Ludovico Barbo, O.S.B. (1381–1443), also referred to as Luigi Barbo, was a significant figure in the movement to reform monastic life in northern Italy during the 15th century. Originally a canon of the community which became the Canons Regular of San Giorgio in Alga, he died a Benedictine abbot and Bishop of Treviso (1437–1443).

== Biography ==
A young nobleman (born into the Barbo family) of the Republic of Venice, in 1397 Barbo received as a benefice the position of commendatory prior of a monastery of Augustinian friars on the isolated island of San Giorgio in Alga. During that period he was influenced by the preaching of an itinerant canon regular, Bernardo of Rome, who was promoting the new form of spirituality known as the Devotio Moderna, which had developed in the Low Countries. Through his brother, Francesco, he was made aware of two cousins, Antonio Correr and Gabriele Condulmer (later to become Pope Eugene IV), also disciples of Bartolomeo, who were following a way of life patterned on that of the Brothers of the Common Life. Inspired by their manner of life, in 1404 he gave the nearly derelict monastery to them, and soon both he and his brother joined the community, which also counted the later saint, Lawrence Giustiniani.

On 30 November of that year, the new monastery had grown to 17 members, all members of the clergy, and received the formal approval of Pope Boniface IX. Though primarily following the life of an enclosed religious order, the canons of the monastery successfully observed the life of the cloister without professing religious vows and also served in a limited form of Christian ministry to the people of the Republic. The success of the community led to the adoption of its format by communities of canons around the region, leading to the formation of a new congregation of canons, presided over by San Giorgio.

Along with Giustiniani, who had become the head of the Priory of St. Augustine in Vicenza, Barbo was tasked to reform the clergy and monastic institutions in Italy. Both men saw methodical prayer and Christian meditation as essential tools for reform. As part of this program, in 1408 Pope Gregory XII appointed him the abbot of the Benedictine Abbey of Santa Giustina in Padua, where he became a Benedictine monk, and with the help of three canons from San Giorgio di Alga worked to reform the life of the monastic community. Despite his relatively young age of 27, Barbo was successful in his efforts, and the abbey flourished to such a degree that it too became the center of a congregation of monasteries following its form of life.

One of Barbo's reforms was to allow his monks to sleep in separate cells, a reform that is regarded as an important step towards enhancing spirituality by providing them with more solitude. Many of the reforms which Barbo instituted were quickly adopted in other monasteries. At the time of his death he had reformed 16 monasteries, including the one at the Basilica of Saint Paul Outside the Walls in Rome.

== See also ==
- Christian monasticism
- Prayer, meditation and contemplation in Christianity

Catholic Church titles
Preceded by	Bishop of Treviso; 1437–1443	Succeeded by Ermolao Barbaro the Elder
