= Barbo Manor =

Coordinates: 45°58′12.35″N 15°4′44.8″E

- Barbova graščina
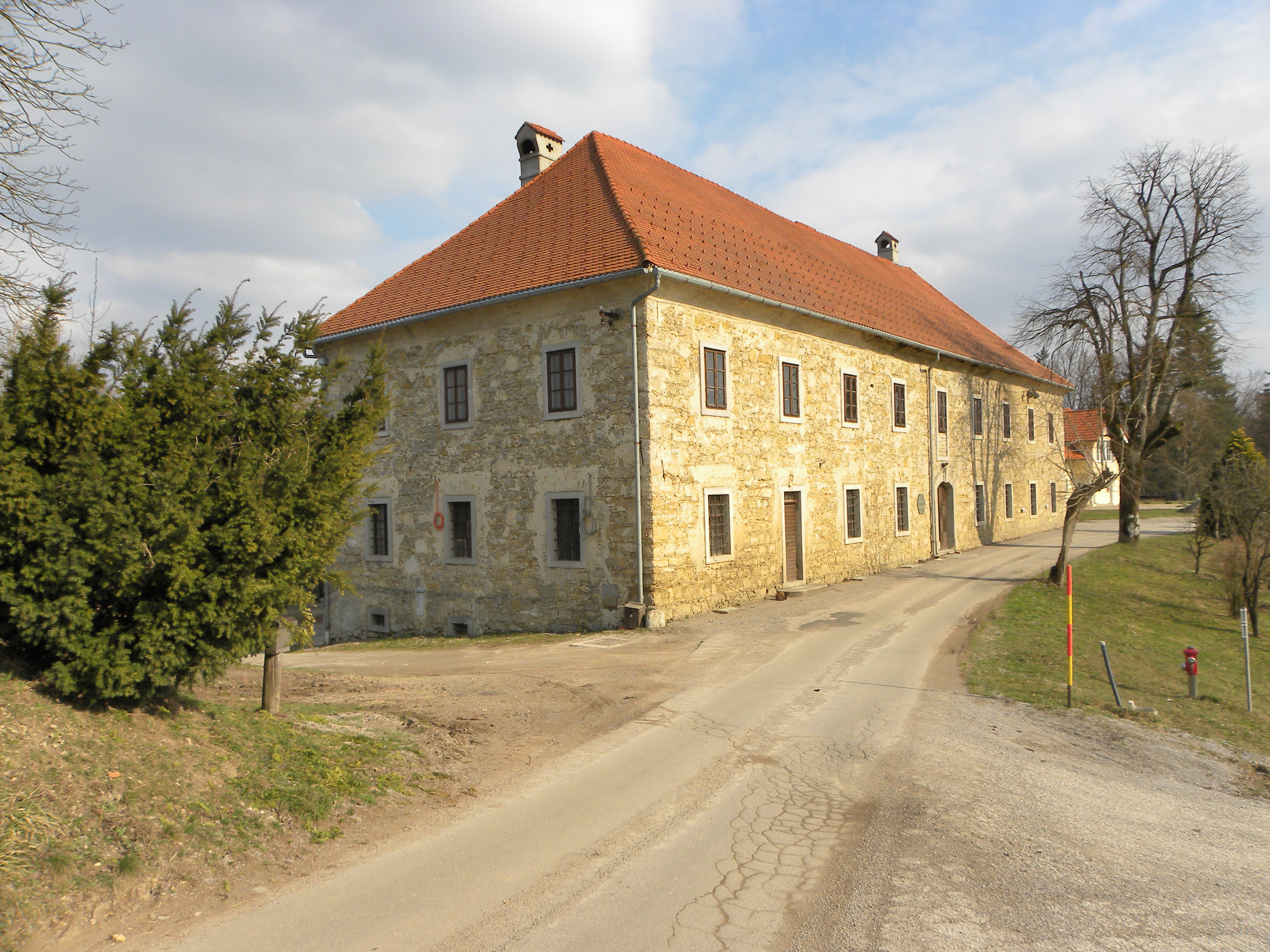
- Interactive map of the Barbo Manor area

General information
- Type: Manor house
- Location: Vesela Gora, Slovenia
- Opened: 1768

Technical details
- Floor area: 34 meters by 12 meters

The Barbo Manor (Slovene: Barbova graščina) is an 18th-century manor-house located in the settlement of Vesela Gora, part of the Municipality of Šentrupert in Inner Carniola, Slovenia.

== History ==
The structure was not originally a manor, but a combination of a parochial house for the parish priest and an overnight hostel on the Vesela Gora pilgrimage route. It was built in 1768, on the site of an earlier, smaller parochial house. After Vesela Gora ceased to be a pilgrimage destination in 1782, the building lost its purpose. In 1825 it was acquired by the noble family of Barbo, who converted it into a residence and thereby gave it its current name. It remained in their possession until 1938, when it was bought by Winzor Edeltrant. In 1942 the manor was partially burned, and its interior furnishings partially looted. After the Second World War the building was nationalized and partially restored. In 1974, its ground floor was turned into an ethnological museum. In 1984, the local Šentrupert–Mirna apiculture society set up a pair of memorial rooms in the first floor dedicated to two local historical figures, the apiarist and doctor Aleksander Lunaček and the priest and art patron Peter Pavel Glavar.

== Architecture ==
The manor has a partial basement and is entirely built of stone, except for the roof. Its floor plan is 34 meters by 12 meters). The longer side of the building is partially dug into the slope; a staircase protruding from the northwestern side connects the basement, ground floor, first floor, and attic. The building was given its present appearance in 1768; the year is carved over the main entrance. The exterior stonework is unstuccoed. All four sides have evenly spaced windows in stone frames. The basement features a large, vaulted wine cellar. Across a courtyard from the manor there is an outbuilding with a vaulted stable.
