= Carl von In der Maur =

Governor of Liechtenstein during 1884–1892 and 1897–1913

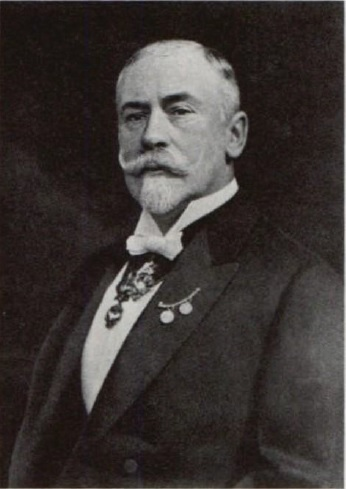

Governor of Liechtenstein
- In office 4 January 1897 – 11 December 1913 (Note: In der Maur served his second term in a "provisional" fashion.)
- Monarch: Johann II
- Preceded by: Friedrich Stellwag von Carion
- Succeeded by: Josef Ospelt
- In office 23 September 1884 – 5 September 1892
- Monarch: Johann II
- Preceded by: Karl Freiherr Haus von Hausen
- Succeeded by: Friedrich Stellwag von Carion

Personal details
- Born: Carl Josef Anton von In der Maur auf Strelburg und zu Freifeld; 16 October 1852 Wiener Neustadt, Austrian Empire
- Died: 11 December 1913 (aged 61) Vaduz, Liechtenstein
- Resting place: St. Martin's Church, Innsbruck, Austria
- Spouse: Auguste von Kogerer (m. 1883)
- Children: Gilbert von In der Maur
- Parents: Karl Johann Josef Romed von In der Maur auf Strelburg und zu Freifeld (father); Barbara Kahl (mother)
- Education: Theresian Military Academy

Carl Josef Anton von In der Maur auf Strelburg und zu Freifeld (also spelled Karl (Note: Either style of the name is used. The spelling of the name as "Carl" was common around 1900. "Karl" became a more common style later on.)) (16 October 1852 – 11 December 1913) was an Austrian aristocrat and statesman who twice served in the court of Johann II as the Governor of Liechtenstein from 1884 until 1892 and again from 1897 until 1913.

In der Maur was born into the Tyrolese noble family of In der Maur in Austria. After completing his education he joined the Lower Austrian State Service. He was appointed Governor of Liechtenstein in 1884. He reformed the administration, expanding regulations and government responsibilities. In der Maur had a domineering style of governance, and often acted contrary to the wishes of the Landtag. He left office in 1892 when he was appointed Fürstlicher Kabinettsrat to Vienna, but maintained connections with the rest of the Liechtenstein government through his membership of its Political Recruitment Office. In der Maur returned to the office of Governor in 1897 to serve in a "provisional fashion". He held the post until his death in 1913 following a stroke during an impassioned debate in the Landtag.

== Early life ==
Carl Josef Anton von In der Maur auf Strelburg und zu Freifeld was born on 16 October 1852 in Wiener Neustadt, Austrian Empire. He belonged to the Tyrolese noble family In der Maur, who were members of the Austrian Landadel in South Tyrol. His father was Karl Johann Josef Romed von In der Maur auf Strelburg und zu Freifeld, who served in the Austrian government as the Assistant Secretary of the Ministry of Education, and his mother was Barbara Kahl. His father had previously been married to Baroness Maria Ludovika Benz de Albkron. He was the elder brother of Ernst Alexander, Marianne Barbara, Friedrich, and Klara Barbara. In der Maur attended secondary school in Vienna before studying law and political science at the Theresian Military Academy, where he graduated with honors in 1875.

== Career ==
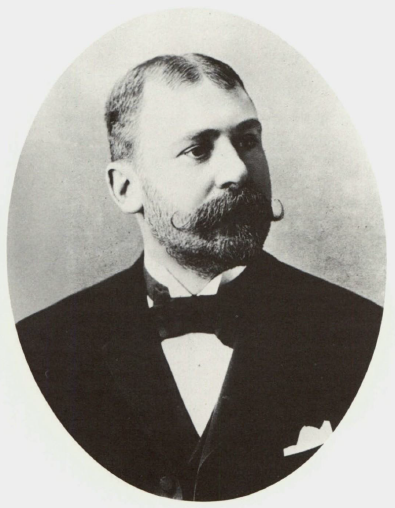
Carl von In der Maur during his earlier years in politics

After finishing school, In der Maur entered the Lower Austrian State Service. In Vaduz he served as Presidential Secretary. On 23 September 1884, In der Maur was appointed Fürstlicher Landesverweser (i.e. Governor) of the Principality of Liechtenstein in Vaduz by Prince Johann II. During this time the Landtag passed an unusually limited amount of legislation. (Note: Vogt writes that between autumn 1884 and December 1890 the Landtag "only" published 11 new laws, three treaties, and eight other ordinances and proclamations.) In lieu of such lawmaking activity, In der Maur's administration was reorganised and assumed more bureaucratic functions and responsibilities. Between autumn 1884 and December 1890 it promulgated 119 new regulations concerning matters such as education, religion, communal governance, prisons, midwifery, chimney sweeping, livestock, and forest management. He took a particular interest in the school system and endeavored to standardise primary education. He approached governance with an authoritarian style and often contradicted the wishes of the Landtag; his government employed "preventive censorship" and suppressed attempts to introduce bills that would ensure freedom of the press.

In der Maur left office on 5 September 1892, when he was appointed Fürstlicher Kabinettsrat to Vienna and was replaced by Friedrich Stellwag von Carion. He maintained his ties with the rest of the Liechtenstein government through his membership of its Political Recruitment Office. In October 1896, Stellwag died and In der Maur returned to Vaduz to assume his old position in a "provisional" fashion. He regained office on 4 January 1897. He officially retained his post in the Political Recruitment Office, though another appointee took charge of his responsibilities. In der Maur continued to serve as provisional Governor of Liechtenstein until his death.

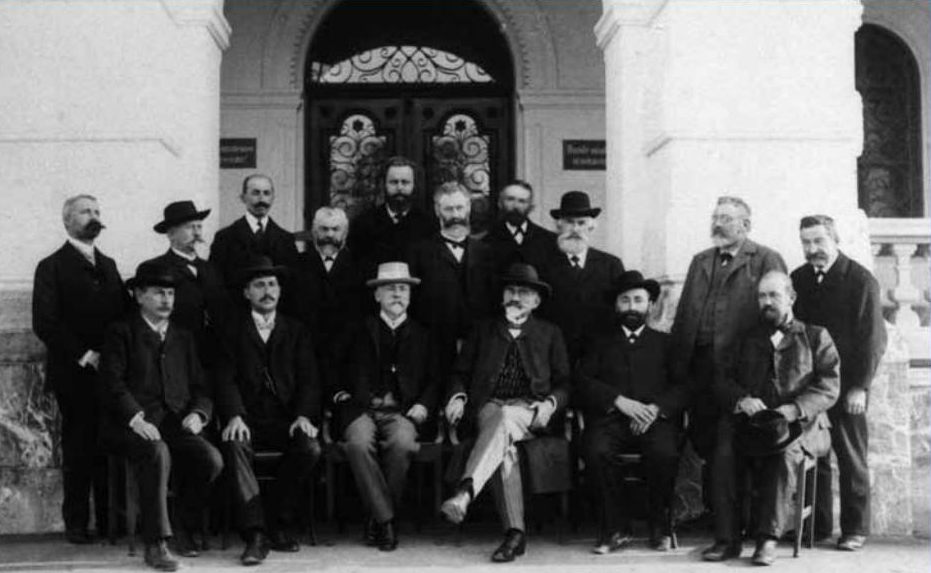
In der Maur (front row, third from left) with members of the Landtag in 1908.

In 1901, In der Maur co-founded and became a board member of the Historical Association for the Principality of Liechtenstein, a post he retained until his death. He received the Jubilee Medal for imperial and royal civil state servants in Austria and was awarded the Commander's Cross of the Imperial and Royal Austrian Order of Franz Joseph in 1909. That year, on the 25th anniversary of his service to Johann II, he was conferred with honorary citizenship of the Principality of Liechtenstein by the Landtag.

=== 1st Cabinet (1884–1892) ===
Governor: Carl von In der Maur – Landesverweser (Governor) (23 Sep 1884 – 5 Sep 1892)

Cabinet Members (Landräte):

Johann Georg Matt – Landrat (representing Unterland), 23 Sep 1884 – c. 1886/88

Johann Georg Marxer – Landrat (representing Oberland), 23 Sep 1884 – 1891

Franz Josef Biedermann – Landrat (representing Unterland), 1889 – 5 Sep 1892

=== Second Cabinet (1896–1913) ===
Governor:Carl von In der Maur – Landesverweser (Governor) (24 Oct 1896 – 11 Dec 1913)

Landräte (Principal Cabinet Officials):

Franz Josef Biedermann – Landrat (Unterland), 24 Oct 1896 – 1898

Meinrad Ospelt – Landrat (Oberland), 24 Oct 1896 – 11 Dec 1913

Deputy Landrat (Participated in Government Meetings):

Lorenz Kind – Deputy Landrat (Unterland), 1902 – 11 Dec 1913

== Personal life and family ==
In der Maur enjoyed learning foreign languages and read Latin classics in his leisure. He was also fond of his work as a bureaucrat and head of government. In a report compiled for top government officials in 1890, he expressed disdain for low-level civil servants and private Liechtensteiner practitioners, reserving positive judgments for foreign noble officials, and asserted that peasants frequently had to be forced to accept "progress". He married Auguste von Kogerer, daughter of Heinrich Ritter von Kogerer, on 11 September 1883 in Vienna. Auguste gave birth on 15 August 1887 in Vaduz to their only son, Gilbert Heinrich Carl August von In der Maur auf Strelberg und zu Freifeld.

=== Death ===
In der Maur's health steadily declined as he aged. During a heated debate in the Landtag he suffered from a stroke, eventually dying on 11 December 1913 in Vaduz. A requiem mass was held on 15 December and he was interred in the crypt of St. Martin's Church in Gnadenwald, Innsbruck.

== Bibliography ==
In der Maur wrote numerous legal and historical essays during his lifetime, including:

- Die Gründung des Fürstenthums Liechtenstein (1901)
- Feldmarschall Johann Fürst von Liechtenstein und seine Regierungszeit im Fürstentum (1905)
- Verfassung und Verwaltung im Fürstentum Liechtenstein (1907)
- Johann II. Fürst von Liechtenstein (1908)
