= Italian destroyer Dardo =

Dardo was the name of at least two ships of the Italian Navy and may refer to:

- Italian destroyer Dardo (1900), a Lampo-class destroyer launched in 1900 and discarded in 1920.
- Italian destroyer Dardo (1930), a Freccia-class destroyer launched in 1930, captured by Germany in 1943 and renamed TA31. She was scuttled in 1945.
