= Rakovnik pri Šentrupertu =

- Location in Slovenia
- Coordinates: 45°57′44.12″N 15°5′36.72″E
- Country: Slovenia
- Traditional region: Lower Carniola
- Statistical region: Southeast Slovenia
- Municipality: Šentrupert

Area
  - Total: 2.07 km^{2} (0.80 sq mi)
- Elevation: 251.6 m (825 ft)

Population (2002)
  - Total: 108

Rakovnik pri Šentrupertu (pronounced [ˈɾaːkɔu̯nik pɾi ʃɛnˈtɾuːpɛɾtu] or [ˈɾaːkɔu̯nik pɾi ʃənˈtɾuːpɛɾtu]; German: Kroisenbach) is a village in the Municipality of Šentrupert in southeastern Slovenia. It lies south of Šentrupert and east of Mirna in the historical region of Lower Carniola. The railway line from Sevnica to Trebnje runs across the settlement's territory. The Municipality of Šentrupert is now included in the Southeast Slovenia Statistical Region.

== Name ==
The name of the settlement was changed from Rakovnik to Rakovnik pri Šentrupertu in 1953. In the past the German name was Kroisenbach.

== Notable people ==
- Count Josef Anton Barbo von Waxenstein (1863–1930), aristocrat and politician
