= Ruggero Marino =

Italian journalist, writer and poet

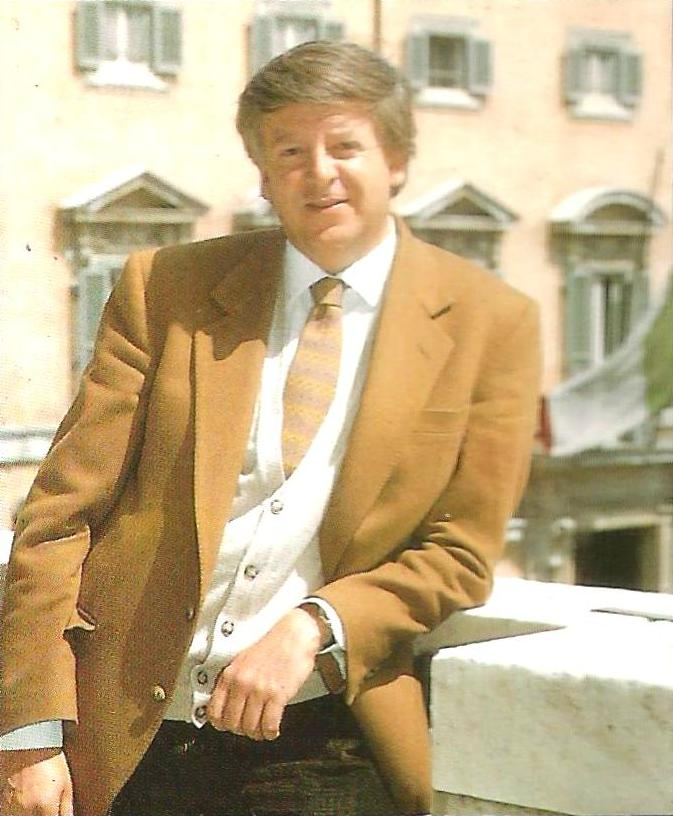
Ruggero Marino's photo shot on the terrace of Il Tempo newspaper in Rome.

Ruggero Marino (born 4 March 1940, in Verbania Intra) is a retired Italian journalist, writer and poet who was special envoy and chief editor of Il Tempo (a major newspaper in Rome), and worked under the direction of Gianni Letta.

== Biography ==
He was responsible for the cultural editorials published in the famous Roman daily journal, Il Tempo. Marino is the author of the book Christopher Columbus and the betrayed Pope, published in four editions: 1st through 3rd (Newton Compton, 1991), 4th (RTM Multimedia, 1997). The fourth edition is adjourned and expanded, with an introduction by Prof. Franco Cardini. Marino also wrote 'Christopher Columbus, the Last of the Templars' (Sperling & Kupfer and Rai Eri, 2005). The text has been translated in seven countries, including the US and Canada.

Marino's text on Christopher Columbus, 'L'uomo che superò i confini del mondo' (English: The Man who surpassed the Boundaries of the World) (Sperling & Kupfer, 2010) won the Culture of the Sea prize and was a finalist in the Premio Acqui Storia (Acqui Award of History) competition; a provocative theatrical version of the text was also produced. Marino was a member of the Commissione Scientifica per le celebrazioni in occasione del Cinquecentenario della morte di Colombo (English: Scientific Commission and National Committee for the celebration of the 500th Anniversary of Christopher Columbus); it was presided over by former Italian minister Claudio Scajola.

== Books ==
- Christopher Columbus and the betrayed Pope (Cristoforo Colombo e il papa tradito), Newton Compton, 1991. (The 4th edition (RTM Multimedia, 1997) is adjourned and expanded, with an introduction by Prof. Franco Cardini.)
- Christopher Columbus, the Last of the Templars (Cristoforo Colombo l'ultimo dei templari), Sperling & Kupfer editors – Rai Eri, 2005 and Fabbri Editore, 2006. (The book has been translated in seven countries: USA and Canada, Romania, Czech Republic, Poland, Spain (2 editions), Portugal).
- Christopher Columbus, The Man who surpassed the Boundaries of the World (L'uomo che superò i confini del mondo), Sperling & Kupfer, 2010.
- Stella and the circus (Stella e il circo), Sperling & Kupfer, 2012.

== See also ==
Ruggero Marino official website (in Italian and some English pages even some other minor pages like Spanish, French and east-European languages.)
