= Franz Engelbert Barbo von Waxenstein =

Slovenian nobleman and Catholic bishop

- Titular Bishop of Dara
- Church: Catholic Church
- See: Dara
- In office: 4 June 1703 – 25 December 1706
- Predecessor: Francisco Zapata Vera y Morales
- Successor: Alfonso Archi
- Other post: Auxiliary Bishop of Wrocław (1703-1706)

Orders
- Ordination: 21 March 1688
- Consecration: 20 February 1704

Personal details
- Born: 21 July 1664 Laibach, Duchy of Carniola, Austrian Circle, Holy Roman Empire
- Died: 25 December 1706 (aged 42) Breslau, Duchy of Pless, Bohemia, Holy Roman Empire

Franz Engelbert Barbo von Waxenstein (21 July 1664 – 25 December 1706) was a Carniolan nobleman who was the Count of Waxenstein and Baron of Gutteneck, Päßberg and Zobelsberg. He served as Titular Bishop of Dara and Auxiliary Bishop of Breslau.

== Life ==
Franz Engelbert Barbo von Waxenstein was born on 21 July 1664 in Carniola. He was a member of the noble family Barbo von Waxenstein and the second son of Maximilian Valerius, Imperial Count of Barbo von Waxenstein and Maria Christiane, Baroness von Brenner. His mother chose a religious career for him, and so he was educated to be a priest. He attended the Collegium Germanicum in Rome from 1684 until 1688, when he was ordained as a Catholic priest.

He was appointed Auxiliary bishop of Breslau by Pope Clement XI in 1703, succeeding Bishop Johann Brunetti. He was also appointed to the position of Titular bishop of Dara the same year.

He died on 25 December 1706 in Breslau.
