= Joseph Emanuel Barbo von Waxenstein =

19th-century Slovenian nobleman

Graf Joseph Emanuel Barbo von Waxenstein
- Jožef Emanuel Barbo Waxenstein
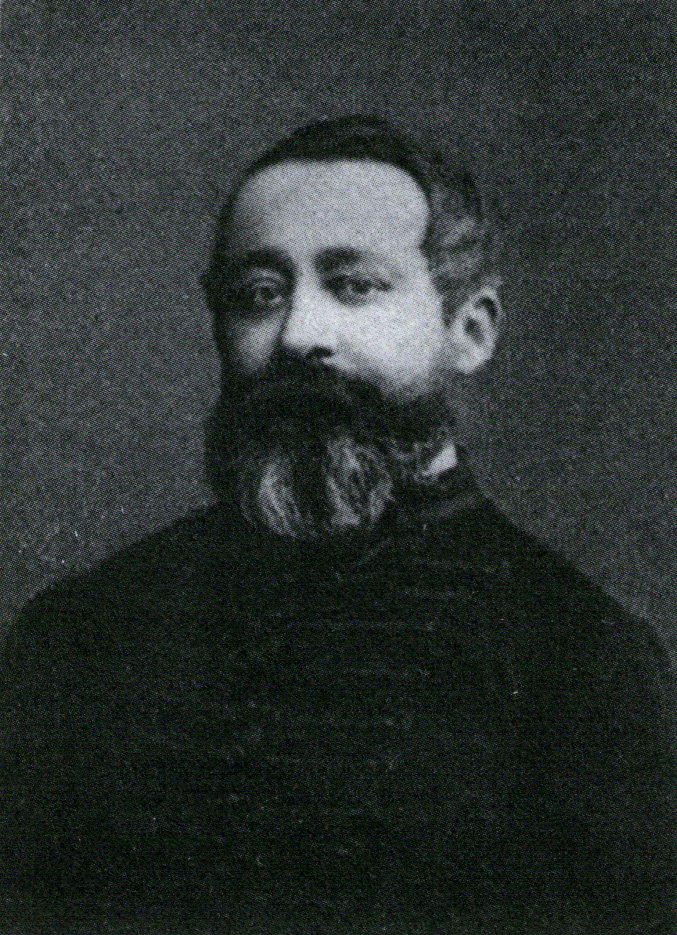
- Born: October 26, 1825; Kroisenbach/Rakovnik, Duchy of Carniola, Austrian Empire
- Died: November 23, 1879 (aged 54); Vienna, Cisleithania, Austria-Hungary
- Occupation: Politician

Count Joseph Emanuel Maria Dismas Otto Vincenz Barbo von Waxenstein (26 October 1825 – 23 November 1879) was a Slovenian politician and aristocrat.

== Early life ==
Joseph Emanuel Barbo von Waxenstein was born on 26 October 1825 in Rakovnik pri Šentrupertu to Count Maria Dismas Wenzel Otto Barbo von Waxenstein (1801–1848) and his wife, Countess Adelheid Batthyány von Német-Újvár (1801–1889), a second cousin of later Hungarian Prime Minister Lajos Batthyány.

== Biography ==
Barbo von Waxenstein served as a State Member of Parliament from 1867 until 1879. He was an advocate for the use of Slovene in Vienna and supported Slovenian cultural institutions. As a member of Parliament he voted in favor of dualism and against the December Constitution. He left the National Assembly in 1870 after a new law on direct elections was adopted. He was a conservative politician and member of the Hohenwart Club. He served as president of the Carniolan Agricultural Service.

He married Countess Valesca Caroline Antonie Henriette Ludmille Antonie Henrietta Ludmilla von Arco. Their children were Count Maria Weikhard Anton Josef Heinrich Otto Barbo von Waxenstein, Count Otto Maria Josef Adolf Albin Barbo von Waxenstein, Countess Gabriele Maria Karolina Antonia Barbo von Waxenstein, Countess Maria Anna Josepha Elisabeth Barbo von Waxenstein, Countess Maria Josefa Leontine Angela Pia Barbo von Waxenstein, and Count Maria Josef Anton Guido Leo Joachim Barbo von Waxenstein.

He died on 23 November 1879 in Vienna.
