= Marco Barbo =

Venetian principal papal administrator

His Eminence Marco Barbo
- Cardinal-Bishop
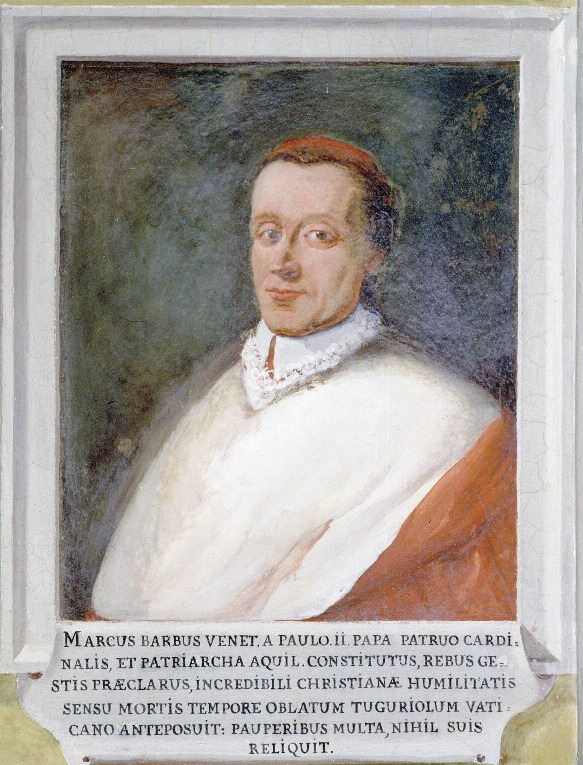
- Church: San Marco (1378-1384)
- Diocese: Treviso (1455), Vicenza (1464), Aquileia (1470)

Orders
- Created cardinal: 18 September 1467 by Pope Paul II
- Rank: Cardinal Priest, then Cardinal Bishop of Palestrina

Personal details
- Born: 1420 Venice
- Died: 2 March 1491 (aged 70–71) Rome
- Buried: Church of S. Marco, Rome
- Residence: Venice, Vicenza, Rome
- Parents: Marino Barbo; Filippa della Riva
- Occupation: diplomat, administrator
- Profession: bishop

Marco Barbo (1420 – 2 March 1491) of Venice was a cousin and lifetime follower of Cardinal Pietro Barbo, who became Pope Paul II in 1464. Marco was appointed Bishop of Vicenza on 17 September 1464; appointed a cardinal of the Roman Catholic Church on 18 September 1467; and Patriarch of Aquileia in 1470. He was a principal papal administrator.

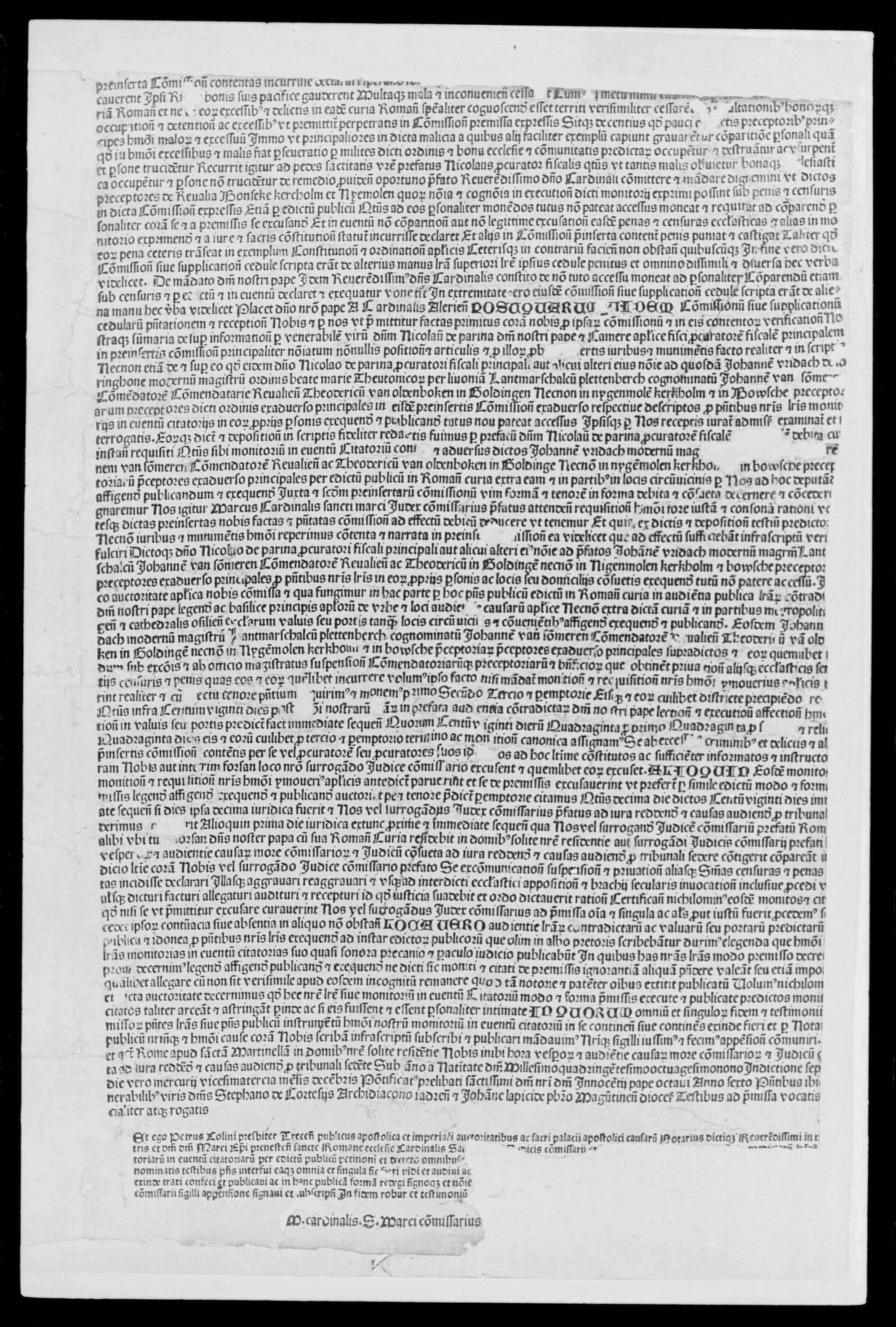
Instrumentum monitorium contra Johannes Vridach, Johannes von Sommeren, Komtur von Reval et sociis, 1490

== Biography ==
Marco Barbo, the eldest son of Marino di Ser Marco Barbo and Filippa della Riva, was a member of the noble Barbo family of Venice, and a third cousin of Pietro Barbo, who became Pope Paul II.

On 20 November 1438, the eighteen-year-old Marco was presented by his father at the offices of the Venetian Avogadori, to qualify him to attend the Major Council.

Marco became Maestro di casa of his cousin the cardinal, and in 1449 became his procurator for the Premonstratensian abbey of Sainst Severo e Martirio near Orvieto.

On 7 September 1455, or 14 November 1455, he was appointed Bishop of Treviso by Pope Calixtus III.

=== Bishop ===
Barbo was appointed Bishop of Vicenza on 17 September 1464, in succession to his cousin, Pietro Barbo, who had been elected pope on 30 August 1464. He took possession of the diocese by proxy on 27 April 1465, Bishop Angelo Fasolo of Feltre acting on his behalf. He held the diocese until he was promoted Patriarch of Aquileia on 18 March 1470. He did not reside in the patriarchate.

In 1465, Paul II, who had heard a good deal of disquieting information about the Knights of Rhodes (Cavaliers of S. John of Jerusalem), appointed a committee, which included his cousin the Bishop of Vicenza, to attend the General Congregation of the Knights. After a detailed report, featuring the financial state of the Knights, was presented, Paul II issued a bull "Quamvis ex Commisso" on 14 February 1466, embodying an analysis of the problems and the outlines of a reform of the Order. Bishop Marco Barbo was assigned the Roman priory of the Order in commendam.

=== Cardinal ===
Barbo was appointed a cardinal by Pope Paul II on 18 September 1467, and assigned the titular church of San Marco on 2 October 1467. In Rome Marco Barbo resided in the Palazzo di San Marco, as did Paul II, who had been Cardinal of S. Marco, and chose not to change his residence to the Vatican. From 1467, Marco was the cardinal patron of the Knights of Rhodes, for whom he built the loggia on the imperial forums.

In 1468, Cardinal Barbo was carrying out the functions of the office of Camerlengo, which had been vacated by the death of Cardinal Luigi Scarampi on 22 March 1465. He issued regulations to curb the hoarding of grain after a bad harvest, and he gave instructions on the transport of grain to the city of Rome.

Paul II died on 26 July 1471. Barbo participated in the Papal conclave, 1471, which elected Pope Sixtus IV (Francesco della Rovere) on 7 August 1471. He received one vote in the scrutiny. On 22 December 1471 Barbo was made legate to Germany, Hungary and Poland by Pope Sixtus IV, to summon the Emperor Frederick III and the Christian people in his domains to combat the Ottoman Turks. On 21 February 1472 Barbo left Rome. Since he was absent from Rome for two years after Pope Paul's death, on his return he commissioned Paul's tomb from Mino da Fiesole, who completed it in 1477 for Old St. Peter's Basilica; fragments are conserved in the Vatican Museums.

Barbo returned to Rome 26 October 1474. Possessed of several abbacies in commendam, including the monastery of Santa Croce di Sassovivo from 14 July 1476, he was elected Camerlengo of the Sacred College of Cardinals for the year 1478. He was appointed bishop of Palestrina by Pope Sixtus IV in succession to Cardinal Angelo Capranica on 6 November 1478, where he restored the cathedral.

His diplomacy defused the partisan tensions that were building in Rome before the conclave of 1484. For a price, he secured the Castel Sant'Angelo from Girolamo Riario and convinced both Orsini and Colonna factions to evacuate the city, leaving the conclave in security and peace. During the consistory, Barbo was one of those considered papabile, and he received ten votes on the first scrutiny; he had an enemy in Cardinal Rodrigo Borgia, however, who was opposed to his candidacy. The election of Pope Innocent VIII was a compromise effected between cardinals Della Rovere and Rodrigo Borgia (later Pope Alexander VI) to block the candidacy of the Cardinal of St. Mark, and was accompanied by simoniacal transactions.

=== Patron of the arts ===
Barbo was an erudite patron of the humanists so distrusted by Paul II, but as Commissary-Administrator of the Sapienza, he was constrained to withhold the salary of Pomponio Leto, who had fled to Venice. Marco Barbo assembled an outstanding library; generous and charitable, he distributed all his wealth to the poor of Rome at his death.

Cardinal Marco Barbo died on 2 March 1491, and was buried in his titular church of S. Marco.

== Works ==
A list of Barbo's works, some unpublished, include:

- Instrumentum monitorium contra Johannes Vridach, Johannes von Sommeren, Komtur von Reval et sociis (in Latin). Lübeck: Matthäus Brandis. 1490.

== Bibliography ==
- Cardella, Lorenzo (1793). Memorie storiche de' cardinali della santa Romana chiesa (in Italian). Vol. Tomo terzo (3). Roma: Pagliarini. pp. 163–165.
- Cicogna, Emmanuele Antonio. Delle Inscrizioni Veneziane. (in Italian and Latin) Volume 2. Venezia: Giuseppe Piccotti 1827. pp. 257-259.
- Eubel, Conradus, ed. (1914). Hierarchia catholica. Vol. 2 (second ed.). Münster: Libreria Regensbergiana.
- Gualdo, Germano. "Barbo, Marco." (in Italian). In: Dizionario Biografico degli Italiani, Volume 6 (1964).
- Riccardi, Tommaso (1786). Storia Dei Vescovi Vicentini (in Italian). Vicenza: Vendramini Mosca. pp. 176–180.
- Zippel, Giuseppe (1921). "Ricordi romani dei Cavalieri di Rodi," (in Italian), in: Archivio della Società romana di storia patria, vol. 44 (1921), pp. 169-205, esp. pp. 189-198.
- Zippel, Giuseppe (1922). "La morte di Marco Barbo, cardinal di S.Marco," (in Italian), in: Scritti storici in onore di Giovanni Monticolo (Padova: La "Litotipo" 1922), pp. 193-203.

Catholic Church titles
Preceded by Oliviero Carafa	Camerlengo of the Sacred College of Cardinals; 1478	Succeeded by Giuliano della Rovere
