= Barbo von Waxenstein =

Italian-Slovenian noble family

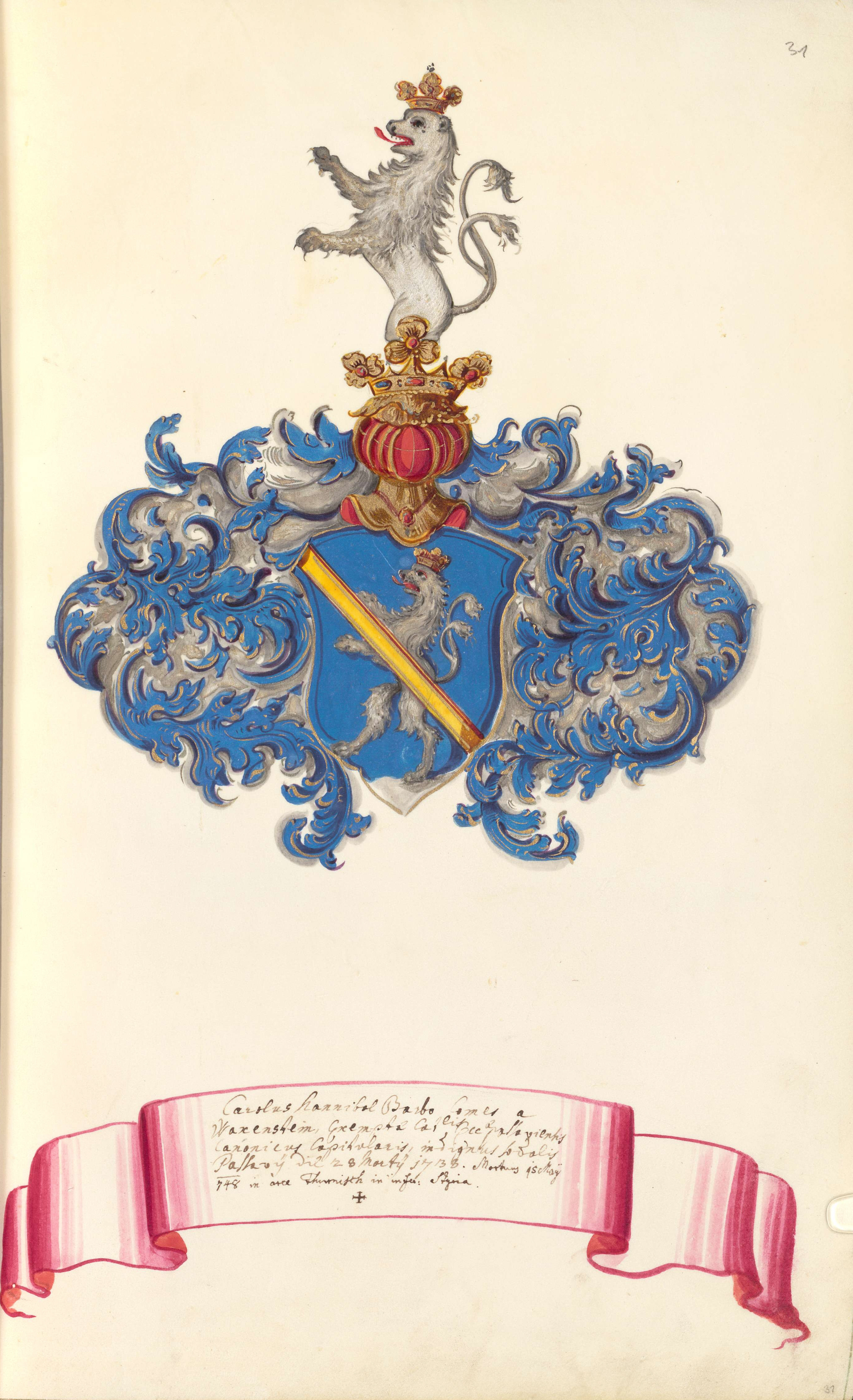
- Coat of arms
- Country: Croatia, Austria, Slovenia
- Connected families: In der Maur; Pace von Friedensberg
- Estates: Wazenberg Castle; Barbo Manor; Posert Castle; Kožljak Castle

The Barbo von Waxenstein family is an old and influential Carniolan noble family of Italian origin, active mostly in the territory of present-day Slovenia and in Istria. The family belonged to the Austrian nobility.

== History ==
The Barbo family originated in Veneto, later moving to Inner Austria, especially Carniola (present-day Slovenia). Although first documented in the 13th century, they claimed descent from Roman Emperor Claudius. In 1547 the family settled in Kožljak (Waxenstein, in German) in Habsburg March of Istria. They were elevated to the rank of Barons in 1622, and to the rank of Imperial Count in 1674 by the Emperor Leopold II. They held the titles barons of Guteneck, Pass and Zobelsberg, lords of Schlüsselstein, Kreussenbach and Dragomel.

The family produced several high-ranking officials and politicians in the Duchy of Carniola. The last male member, count Robert Barbo von Waxenstein died in 1977. He had one daughter, Countess Livia Barbo von Waxenstein, later Baroness von Reden (1921 – 13 October 2018).

== Notable family members ==
- Franz Engelbert Barbo von Waxenstein - Titular Bishop of Dara, Auxiliary Bishop of Breslau
- Count Joseph Emanuel Barbo von Waxenstein - Slovenian politician
  - Count Josef Anton Barbo von Waxenstein - Austrian politician, son of Josef Emanuel
    - Count Robert Barbo von Waxenstein - Slovenian-Austrian author, son of Josef Anton
    - Countess Stella Barbo von Waxenstein - daughter of Josef Anton, daughter-in-law of Hugo II Logothetti
    - Countess Maria Gertrude Valeska Rosa Aloisia Barbo von Waxenstein - daughter of Josef Anton, wife of Gilbert von In der Maur auf Strelberg und zu Freifeld
      - Wolf In der Maur auf Strelberg und zu Freifeld - Austrian journalist, son of Maria Gertrude and Gilbert von In der Maur
