= Bailo of Negroponte =

Representative of the Republic of Venice

The bailo and captain of Negroponte was the representative of the Republic of Venice stationed at Chalcis (Negroponte) on the island of Euboea. The bailo played an important role as the mediator between, and de facto overlord of, the triarchs of Euboea, who had their common residence in Negroponte. The triarchies were created by the division of the island between three rulers (triarchs) after its conquest following the Fourth Crusade (1204).

The Venetian title bailo (plural baili) derives from the Latin baiulus. In English, it may be translated bailiff, or otherwise rendered as bailey, baili, bailie, bailli or baillie.

== List of baili ==
Notes: maggiore = "the elder"; q. = quondam = "son of the late"

- 1216–???? Pietro Barbo il Zanco
- 1222–1224 Benedetto Falier
- 1250 Marino Michiel
- 1252–1254 Leone Sanudo
- 1254–1256 Paolo Gradenigo
- 1256–1258 Marco Gradenigo
- 1258 Tommaso Giustiniani
- 1258–1261 Andrea Barozzi
- 1261–1263 Andrea Barbarigo
- 1263–1265 Nicolò Barbarigo
- 1265–1266 Gilberto Dandolo
- 1266–1267 Filippo Orio
- 1268–1270 Andrea Dandolo (Hopf puts him in 1268–1269)
- ? 1269–1271 Andrea Zeno
- 1270–1271 Andrea Barozzi (not in Hopf)
- 1271–1273 Nicolò Miglani
- 1273–1274 Marco Bembo (Hopf puts him in 1267–1268)
- 1273/4–1275 Vettore Dolfin
- 1275–1276 Nicolò Quirini
- ? 1276–1277 Andrea Dandolo Beretta
- 1276–1277 Pietro Zeno (Hopf puts him in 1277–1278)
- 1277–1279 Jacopo Dondulo (not in Hopf)
- 1278–1280 Nicolò Morosini Rosso
- 1280–1282 Nicolò Falier
- 1282–1283 Andrea Zeno
- 1283–1285 Giovanni Zeno
- 1285–1287 Jacopo da Molino
- 1287–1289 Marino Soranzo
- 1289–1291 Marco Michieli
- 1291–1293 Nicolò Giustiniani
- 1293–1295 ????
- 1295–1297 Jacopo II Barozzi
- 1297–1299 Francesco Contarini
- 1299–1300 Giovanni da Canale
- 1300–1302 Andrea Zeno
- 1302–1304 Francesco Dandolo
- 1304–1306 Pietro Mocenigo
- 1306–1308 Pietro Querini Pezzagallo
- 1308–1310 Belletto Falier
- 1310–1312 Luigi Morosini
- 1312–1314 Enrico Dolfin
- 1314–1316 Gabriele Dandolo
- 1316–1317 Michele Morosini
- 1317–1319 Francesco Dandolo (second time)
- 1319–1321 Lodovico Morosini
- 1321–1322 Gabriele Dandolo
- 1322–1323 Marco Michieli
- 1323–1325 Marino Falier
- 1325–1327 Marco Minotto
- 1327–1329 Marco Gradenigo q. Pietro
- 1329–1331 Filippo Belegno
- 1331–1333 Pietro Zeno
- 1333–1335 Belello Civran
- 1335–1337 Nicolò Priuli
- 1337 Pietro Quirini (not in the Rulers of Venice database)
- 1337–1338 Andrea Dandolo
- 1338 Nicolò Priuli
- 1339–1341 Benedetto da Molin
- 1341–1343 Pancrazio Giustiniani
- 1343–1345 Nicolò Gradenigo
- 1345–1347 Marco Soranzo
- 1347–1349 Giovanni Dandolo
- 1349–1351 Tommaso Viaro
- 1351–1353 Nicolò Quirini
- 1353–1356 Michele Falier
- 1356–1358 Giovanni Dandolo
- 1358–1360 Pietro Morosini
- 1360–1362 Fantino Morosini
- 1362–1364 Pietro Gradenigo
- 1364–1366 Domenico Michieli
- 1366–1368 Giovanni Giustiniani
- 1368–1370 Andrea Zeno
- 1370–1372 Giovanni Dolfin
- 1372–1374 Bartolommeo Quirini
- 1374–1376 Pietro Mocenigo
- 1376–1378 Andrea Barbarigo
- 1378–1379 Carlo Zeno
- 1379–1381 Pantaleone Barbo
- 1381–1383 Andrea Zeno
- 1383–1384 Marino Storlado
- 1384–1386 Fantino Giorgio
- 1386–1387 Donato Trono
- 1387–1389 Saracino Dandolo
- 1389–1391 Guglielmo Quirini
- 1391–1393 Gabriele Emo
- 1393–1395 Andrea Bembo
- 1395–1397 Carlo Zeno (second time)
- 1397–1399 Giovanni Alberto
- 1399–1401 Nicolò Valaresso
- 1401–1402 Francesco Bembo
- 1402–1403 Tommaso Mocenigo
- 1403–1405 Bernardo Foscarini
- 1405–1408 Francesco Bembo
- 1408–1410 Nicolò Venier q. Sergio
- 1410–1412 Paolo Quirini q. Romeo
- 1412–1414 Benedetto Trevisani da San Barnaba
- 1414–1416 Nicolò Giorgio q. Bernardo
- 1416–1418 Vidale Miani maggiore
- 1418–1420 Nicolò Malipiero q. Perazzo
- 1420–1422 Marco Cornaro
- 1422–1424 Daniele Loredano q. Fantino
- 1424–1425 Donato Arimondo maggiore
- 1425–1427 Antonio Michieli maggiore
- 1427–1429 Andrea Capello maggiore
- 1429–1430 Nicolò Loredano q. Fantino
- 1430–1431 Luigi Polani (vicebailo)
- 1431–1432 Andrea Gabrieli
- 1432–1434 Maffio Donato q. Marco
- 1434–1436 Albano Sagredo maggiore
- 1436–1438 Melchiorre Grimani maggiore
- 1438–1440 Fantino Pisani maggiore
- 1440–1442 Nicolò Buono q. Alessandro
- 1442–1444 Bertuccio Civrano q. Pietro
- 1444–1446 Matteo Barbaro q. Antonio
- 1446–1448 Vettore Duodo maggiore
- 1448 Fantino Pisani
- 1448–1451 Giovanni Malipiero q. Perazzo
- 1451–1453 Lorenzo Onorati maggiore
- 1453–1454 Paolo Loredano
- 1454–1456 Angelo da Pesaro q. Nicolò
  - 1454–1456 Carlo Morosini (capitano)
- 1456–1459 Girolamo Bembo maggiore
  - 1456–1458 Francesco Loredano (capitano)
  - 1458–1460 Paolo Barbarigo q. Nicolò (capitano)
- 1459–1461 Leone Venier
  - 1460–1462 Antonio Quirini q. Quirino
- 1461–1463 Leonardo Calbo q. Zanotto
  - 1462–1464 Giovanni Dandolo q. Benedetto
- 1463–1465 Fantino Giorgio q. Giovanni
  - 1464–1466 Giovanni Bembo q. Ettore
- 1465–1468 Francesco Gradenigo q. Jacopo
  - 1466–1467 Giovanni Bondumier q. Antonio (capitano)
  - 1467–1469 Nicolò da Canale (capitano)
- 1468–1470 Paolo Erizzo q. Marco
  - 1469–1470 Luigi Calbo q. Zanotto (capitano)

== See also ==
- Stato da Màr

== Sources ==
- Hopf, Carlo (1856). Dissertazione documentata sulla storia di Karystos nell'isola di Negroponte, 1205–1470 (in Italian). Translated by G. B. de Sardagna. Venice: Pietro Naratovich.
- Jacoby, David (2006). "The Venetian Government and Administration in Latin Constantinople, 1204–1261: A State within a State". In Gherardo Ortalli; Giorgio Ravegnani; Peter Schreiner (eds.). Quarta Crociata. Venezia - Bisanzio - Impero latino. Atti delle giornate di studio. Venezia, 4-8 maggio 2004. Venice: Istituto veneto di scienze, lettere ed arti. pp. 19–79. ISBN 978-8-8881-4374-3.
- Kohl, Benjamin G.; Mozzato, Andrea; O'Connell, Monique. "The Rulers of Venice, 1332-1524". ISBN 1-59740-264-8.
