= Paolo Barbo (1423–1509) =

Paolo Barbo (1423–1509) was a Venetian patrician and statesman.

Barbo was born in 1423 to Andrea Barbo and Maria. His public career can be traced from 1464. In 1481, he was the podestà of Chioggia. He was one of the three savi elected to oversee the affairs of Cyprus before being named podestà of Brescia in 1485. He passed a year in exile at Zadar in 1487–1488. He as lieutenant of Udine in 1491 and an envoy to Pope Alexander VI in 1492. In 1494, he was the captain of Verona. In 1496, he was the lone dissenter in the Venetian Senate concerning the policy of giving Maximilian I of Germany leadership of the Holy League.

From 1496 until his death, Barbo makes regular appearances in the diary of Marino Sanuto. In 1497–1498, he was podestà of Padua. He was one of the foremost advocates of the reversal of Venetian policy that culminated in the Treaty of Blois with Louis XII of France in 1499, although he sought to avoid being dragged into war with Milan. In 1500, he was podestà of Cremona. In 1501, he was elected one of the Savi del Consiglio and, in 1502, one of the Procurators of Saint Mark.

As one of the architect's of Venice's foreign policy, Barbo came out of his semi-retirement to address the Senate after Venice's crushing defeat in the battle of Agnadello on 15 May 1509. When informed of the defeat, he allegedly turned to his wife and asked for his cloak, saying "I wish to go to the Pregadi [Senate], and say four words and then die." He died on 27 July. In noting his death, Sanuto, who praises his administration of Padua, describes him as "very wise, but stubborn" (sapientissimo ma ostinato). An inventory of his house was made on 1 August, revealing a luxurious standard of living.

== Bibliography ==
- Allerston, Patricia (1998). "Wedding Finery in Sixteenth-Century Venice". In Trevor Dean; K. J. P. Lowe (eds.). Marriage in Italy, 1300–1650. Cambridge University Press. pp. 25–40.
- Cracco, Giorgio (1964). "Barbo, Paolo". Dizionario Biografico degli Italiani, Volume 6: Baratteri–Bartolozzi (in Italian). Rome: Istituto dell'Enciclopedia Italiana. ISBN 978-8-81200032-6.
- Hazlitt, William Carew (1915). The Venetian Republic: Its Rise, Its Growth, and Its Fall 421–1797. Vol. 2: 1457–1797. London: Adam and Charles Black.
- Okey, Thomas (1910). Venice and Its Story (3rd rev. ed.). J. M. Dent & Sons.
