= Heinrich Ritter von Kogerer =

Austrian aristocrat and government official

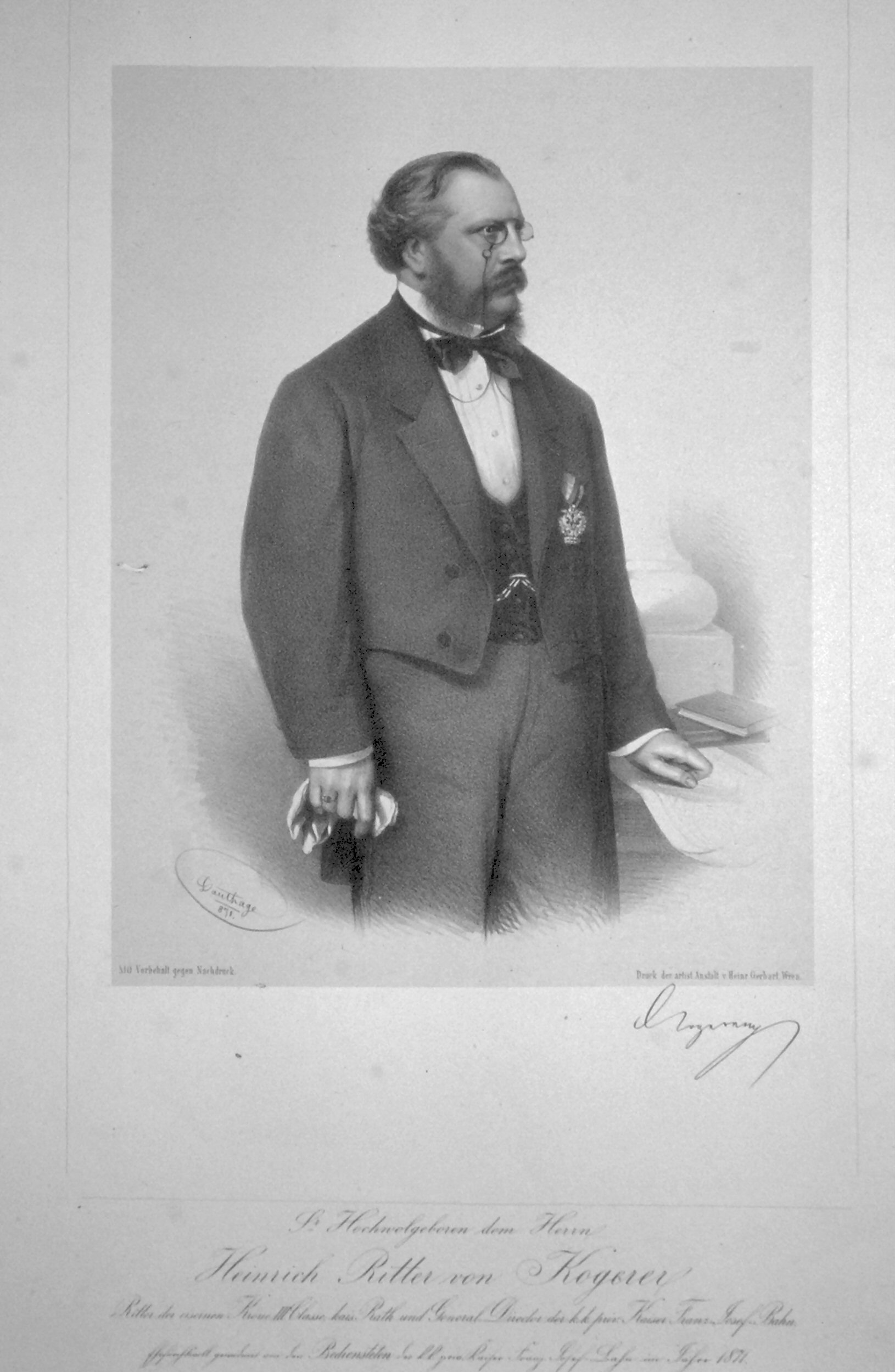
- Lithograph of Kogerer by Adolf Dauthage

Director General of the Austro-Hungarian Empire
- Monarch: Franz Joseph I

Personal details
- Born: Heinrich Ritter von Kogerer; 18 March 1819
- Died: 20 November 1899
- Spouse: Julia Patonaz
- Children: Auguste von Kogerer

Heinrich Ritter von Kogerer (18 March 1819 – 20 November 1899) was an Austrian statesman who served as the Imperial and Royal Court Counselor and Director General of the Austro-Hungarian Empire.

== Personal life ==
He was married to Julia Patonaz. His daughter, Auguste von Kogerer (1862-1916), married Carl von In der Maur.
