= Pantaleone Barbo =

Pantaleone Barbo was a distinguished diplomat of the Venetian Republic. He was the Venetian ambassador to Constantinople, and became the first bailo of Corfu in 1389. Amongst his other diplomatic appointments, he served as Provveditore of Crete in 1363, captain of Crete in 1389, and duke of Crete in 1395. He also served as bailo and captain of Negroponte.

== Diplomatic career ==
Barbo was sent as Venetian ambassador to Constantinople on the occasion of the death of John V Palaiologos "to express the Republic's distress 'at the death of our true and perfect friend'" and to liaise with John V's successor Manuel II Palaiologos.

In 1386 Barbo accompanied Venetian diplomat Lorenzo de Monacis to Hungary representing Venice's interests during a crisis involving the succession to the Hungarian throne. The diplomatic mission was successful as described in a report by de Monacis to the Venetian government.

In 1389, Barbo accompanied de Monacis again on another diplomatic mission to Hungary when they fell victims to robbery. The two diplomats, having lost all their belongings during the incident, received 60 gold ducats as compensation by the Maggior Consiglio of Venice.

== Sentence ==
Barbo participated in a diplomatic proposal by the Doge of Venice Antonio Venier involving giving the island of Tenedos to John V Palaiologos instead of destroying it according to the Venetian plan "factum ruynationis Tenedi". According to the Doge, "it would be offensive to God and to all mankind to disperse the Greek population of Tenedos and to destroy everything on the island". The doge also wanted to keep the island as an aid to maritime navigation and argued that the Ottoman Turks could rebuild it even if the Venetians destroyed it.

However the proposal of the Doge did not succeed due to Genoan and Venetian opposition. In the aftermath of the diplomatic crisis, Barbo was sentenced on 17 April 1383 to "deprivation of all offices of state for ten years". Additional sentence proposals included imprisonment of between six months to a year "in one of the lower prisons" and exile from Venice and the Veneto for five years. These proposals were rejected by the Senate. Eventually the sentence was reduced after the Tenedos controversy had subsided. His sentence was reduced "as too severe for a man who has committed his life to the service of the Signoria, with exemplary loyalty". On 8 March 1392 Barbo was sent to Constantinople as Venetian ambassador during John V Palaiologos's funeral.
