= Josef Anton Barbo von Waxenstein =

19th and 20th-century Slovenian nobleman and politician

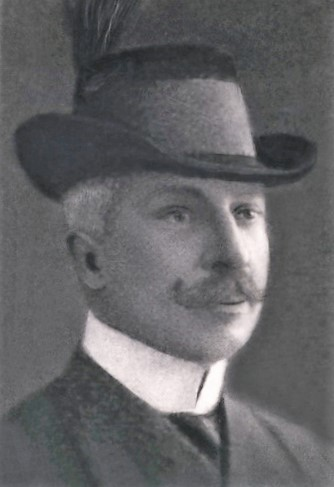
- Born: Maria Josef Anton Guido Leo Joachim Graf Barbo von Waxenstein; 20 February 1863; Kroisenbach, Austrian Empire (today Slovenia)
- Died: 11 May 1930 (aged 67); Novo Mesto, Kingdom of Yugoslavia (today Slovenia)
- Spouses: Margit Vidats; Mária Róza Valéria Sternberg-Rudelsdorf de Sarawenza
- Issue: 5
- Occupation: politician, statesman

Count Maria Josef Anton Guido Leo Joachim Barbo von Waxenstein (Note: "Maria Josef Anton Guido Leo Joachim Graf Barbo von Waxenstein" in German, "Marija Jožef Anton Guido Leo Joachim Grof Barbo von Waxenstein" in Slovenian) (20 February 1863 – 11 May 1930) was an Austrian aristocrat, politician, landowner, and member of the Imperial Council of Austria-Hungary.

== Early life ==
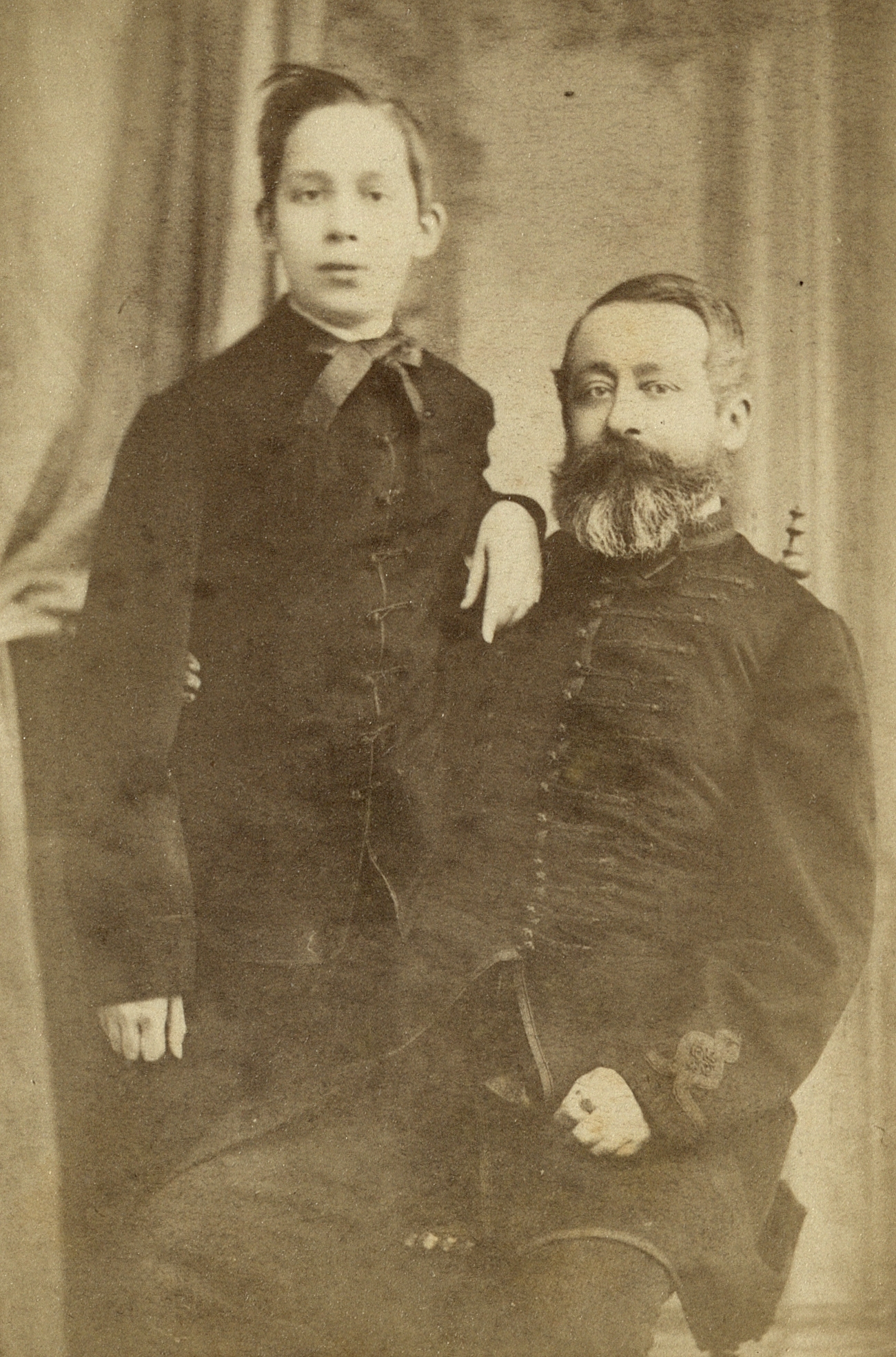
Barbo von Waxenstein (left) with his father

Josef Anton Barbo von Waxenstein was born on 20 February 1863 in Kroisenbach (now Rakovnik pri Šentrupertu) to Count Joseph Emanuel Maria Dismas Otto Vincenz Barbo von Waxenstein and Countess Valesca Caroline Antonie Henriette Ludmille Antonie Henrietta Ludmilla von Arco. He was a scion of the aristocratic Barbo von Waxenstein family. His father had been a member of the Austrian parliament between 1867 until 1879, and a staunch supporter of the Slovenian national revival.

Barbo von Waxenstein attended the Higher Agricultural School in Mosonmagyaróvár. After the death of his father, he took over the management of the family estates in Kroisenbach and Watzenberg. He was involved in various agricultural associations while running the family estates.

== Career ==
Barbo von Waxenstein served in the Austro-Hungarian military for one year as a volunteer in the 5th Dragon Regiment and was later promoted to Lieutenant of the Reserve and Senior Lieutenant of mounted Tyrolean country shooters. He was active as a captain in Ljubljana during World War I. He served in the Krainer Landtag from 1895 until 1918. He also served on the State Committee from 1905 until 1918. He was elected as a courier of the landlords in the 1915 Imperial Council election, having previously represented landowners from 1901 until 1907 in the Imperial Council of the Austro-Hungarian Empire. He ran again for a position in the Council in 1911 and was appointed to preside over Electoral District Krain 12, serving until 1918. He was a member of the German Agrarian Party from 1911 until 1917. From 1918 until 1919 Barbo von Waxenstein was a member of the Provisional National Assembly.

== Personal life ==
Barbo von Waxenstein was married twice; first to Margit Vidats and later to Countess Mária Róza Valéria Sternberg-Rudelsdorf de Sarawenza. He had five children: Count Maria Konrad Heinrich Barbo von Waxenstein, Count Marija Robert Josef Barbo von Waxenstein, Countess Maria Gertrude Valeska Rosa Aloisia Barbo von Waxenstein, Countess Maria Edeltraut Barbo von Waxenstein and Countess Maria Stella Leontina Valeska Barbo von Waxenstein.

Barbo von Waxenstein died on 11 May 1930 in Novo Mesto.
