= In der Maur =

Swiss-Austrian family

In der Maur In der Mauer
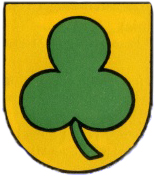
- Green cloverleaf in gold, the Escutcheon of the In der Maurs of Berneck (from 1478)
- Country: Switzerland; Austria
- Origin: Rhaetian Alps, Switzerland
- Traditions: Roman Catholicism; Swiss Reformed

In der Maur (also written as In der Mauer, Indermaur, Indermauer) is a Swiss family. Throughout the Middle Ages and Renaissance, members of the family held political offices in Berneck, St. Gallen. The In der Maur von Berneck family were first granted a coat of arms in 1478, when Hermann In der Maur was appointed as the Ammann of Berneck of the Abbot of St. Gallen. Members of the family also served as Imperial tax collectors and as clerks of the Court of Berneck. The first member of the family to hold the position of Ammann in Berneck was Ulrich In der Maur in 1435.

A member of the Bernecker branch, Hans Indermaur, settled in Rheineck in 1590, where his descendants were granted fiefdoms. The Indermaur von Rheineck family were granted a coat of arms in 1685, first used by Johann In der Maur, and members of this family served as magistrates and clerks of the Court of Rheineck.

A cadet branch of the family based in South Tyrol, In der Maur auf Strehlburg und zu Freifeld, was elevated to the lower nobility in Kurtatsch an der Weinstraße by Rudolf II, Holy Roman Emperor in 1601. They were previously granted coats of arms in 1479, 1491, and 1586.

== History ==
The In der Maur family originated in the Rhaetian Alps in Switzerland, descending from the Alemanni. The surname from the German language, translates to "in the wall", possibly referring to a fortress, defensive wall, or a geographic moor. The main branches of the family settled within the territory of the Holy Roman Empire that is now Eastern Switzerland, Southern Austria and Northern Italy.

=== Berneck ===
During the Middle Ages the In der Maurs were granted the right to use heraldry. Hermann In der Maur (or Mur) was granted a coat of arms including a green shamrock clover leaf on a golden shield in 1478. They were members of the Bürgergemeinde, and therefore part of the Swiss bourgeoisie, Throughout the Middle Ages and Renaissance period, the In der Maurs held administrative roles in the government of Farniwang/Bernang (later called Berneck) as Landamänner (Ammann), or chief magistrates of the rural Landsgemeinde, and as clerks of the court (Gerichtsschreiber). They continued having political and economic influence in the region after the Abbey of Saint Gall gained control, having been granted privileges by the Prince-Abbots of St. Gallen. With these privileges, they held the position of Ammann of the Abbot of St. Gall to Bernang. The In der Maurs also served as Imperial tax collectors (Landvogtammaenner) for Bernang on behalf of the Imperial Landvogt. Jakob Indermaur was Seckelmeister (treasury master) in 1699. Johann Indermaur was a court clerk in 1705. Hans Georg Indermaur served as a court clerk from 1805 to 1807. Ulrich In der Maur was appointed as Ammann in 1435. One of his descendants, Hermann In der Maur, was made Ammann in 1458. Another Hermann In der Maur was appointed as Ammann in 1493. Hans Indermaur was made Ammann in 1554. Ulrich In der Maur became Ammann in 1614. Johannes Indermaur was made Ammann in 1719. Josef Indermaur zu Bernang became Ammann in 1741.

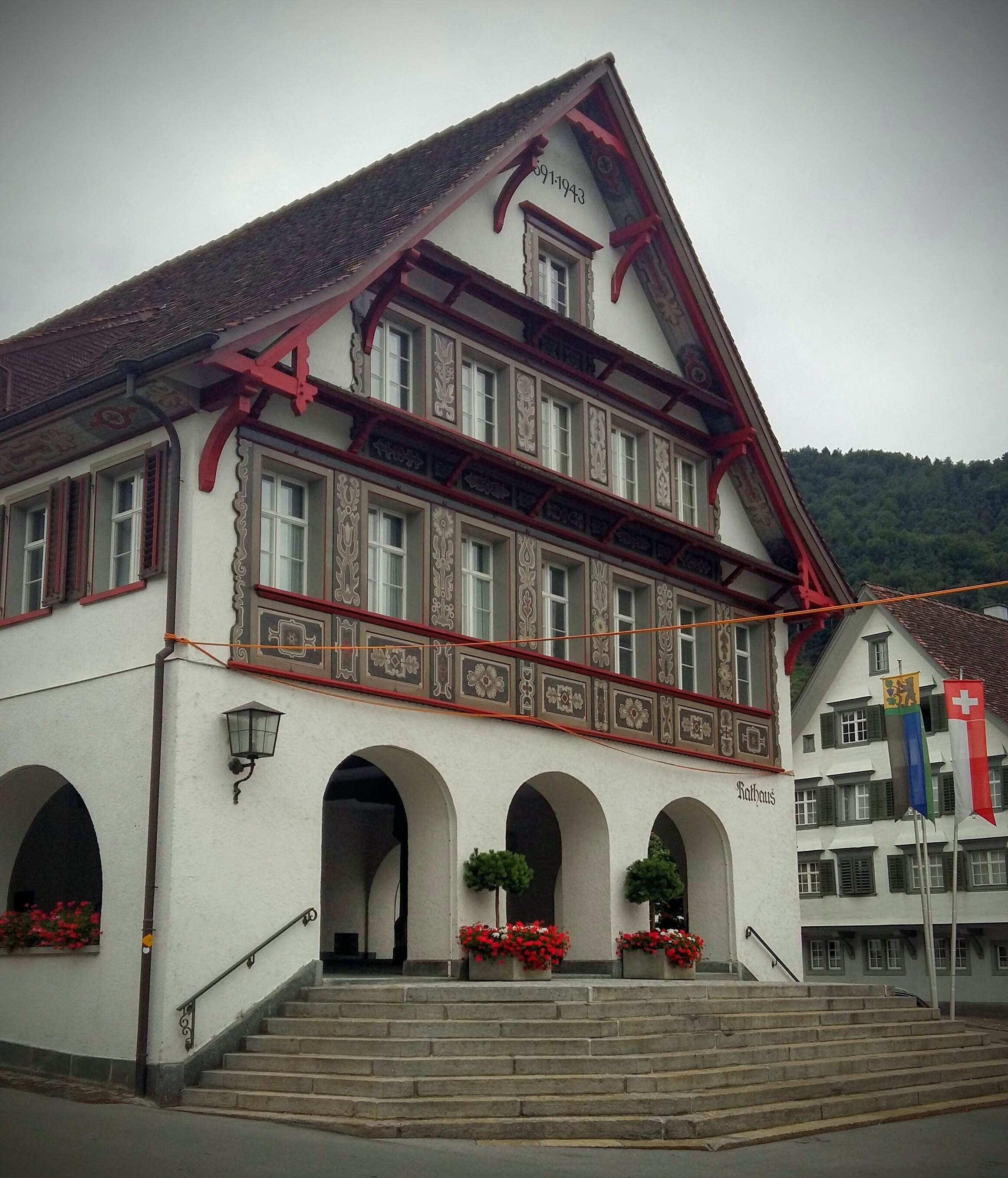
Town hall of Berneck, from which the Indermaurs governed

In 1525, Berneck's population, facing political pressure, converted from Catholicism to Protestantism. By 1532, more than half of the residents had returned to their original religion. The In der Maurs of Berneck, who had adopted the religious reforms of Huldrych Zwingli during the Reformation and became Protestant, chose to remain in the Reformed faith.

In 1609, the Ammann Ulrich Indermaur, along with Thomas Haingler and Georg Schegg as appointed committee members and official representatives of the Court of Berneck, handled a property and inheritance dispute with Count Kaspar zu Hohenems. In 1610 Ulrich Indermaur was part of a group of government officials who made inspections with the local bailiff and Prince-Abbot's ordiners. In 1613, members of the Reichsvogt including Jakob Spengler, Joachim Rütlinger, Otmar Rheiner, Jakob Allgöwer, and Georg Gruber approved an exchange of land and crops between the Hospital in St. Gallen and Bartholome Wettach, another official and resident of Berneck. Ulrich Indermaur collected taxes on the property, including an annual interest of 1 pound, 9 shillings, 10 pfennings, and 2 chickens, as well as a premium of 5 guilders, which went back to the hospital. On 24 February 1615, Ulrich Indermaur served as one of five delegates representing the farms of the Upper Rhine Valley.

In 1612, the Lords of Zürich, supporting Protestantism, selected a local preacher named Heinrich Rauch to fill the post in Berneck. Rauch was presented to Prince-Abbot Bernhard Müller by Baltus Torgler and the Ammann Heinrich Indermaur on behalf of the lords. This offended the Catholic Prince-Abbot, who believed filling the position was his right. He called upon his courtier, Isidor Metzler, a clergyman and doctor of church law, to look into the violation against the Imperial Abbey. Metzler argued that the right to appoint priests and preachers in Berneck was granted solely to the Church in St. Gallen, and that the Abbot had the right to appoint clergy throughout the imperial territory without the approval or recommendations of the lords. After Rauch agreed to keep in line with Church teaching and to preach peace and unity in the community, he was allowed to make his vows to the Prince-Abbot and was granted a fiefdom. On 14 July 1614, the Ammann Ulrich Indermaur signed and presented a request to Prince-Abbot Müller on behalf of the priest Sebastian Roth of Berneck and the local Catholic Church to appoint the clergyman Georg Keizer, the former pastor of Flawil, to a local curatorship and allow him to preach at the early masses.

The In der Maur family owned vineyards in the Rhine Valley. Konrad (Cunradten) Indermaur owned a vineyard that bordered the estate of the Franz family, and the Pfarrpfrund. Ulrich Indermaur owned a vineyard that bordered the vineyards of Hans Curer, Hans Böckhen, and Antoni Frei. A vineyard owned by Bartli Indermaur bordered that of Antoni Frei and Otmar Noll's heirs, near Mühlebach. In 1615 the Ammann of Berneck, Ulrich Indermaur, owned a vineyard called Tannweg that bordered the estates of Rudolf Jäkli, Sebastuan Dierauer, and Kaspar Weber. Jakob Indermaur owned a vineyard that bordered the property of George Seiz and Ulrich Seitz. In 1620, Jakob Indermaur was one of 13 men ordered by the Court of Berneck to ensure streets, paths, and bridges were cleared and cleaned between the vineyards of the Junker Hans Kaspar Rugg von Tannegg, representing his cousin Magdalena Rugg, the Ammann Hans Kaufmann, and Lukas Studach von Altstätten.

=== Kurtatsch an der Weinstraße, Bavaria, and Liechtenstein ===
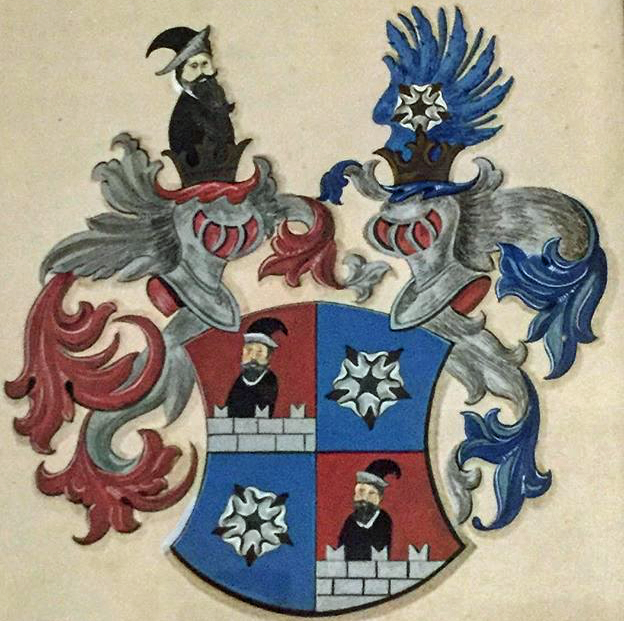
Coat of arms of the Austrian branch of the family, In der Maur auf Strelburg und zu Freifeld

In 1396, Hans jn der Maewr ab Pennoen (Penon, a small hamlet near Kurtatsch an der Weinstraße) appears in a local deed issued in the Habsburg-ruled South Tyrol. In 1479, a branch of In der Maurs, who settled in Habsburg-ruled South Tyrol, were granted a coat of arms by Frederick III of the Holy Roman Empire. On 23 October 1491 they were granted another coat of arms by Maximilian II. A third coat of arms was granted to six brothers and three male cousins of the family on 1 August 1586 in Innsbruck. On 6 March 1601 the In der Maurs in South Tyrol were elevated to the landed nobility by Rudolf II. Some members of the family were granted the rank of edler, the lowest rank in the titled nobility. On 23 June 1703 the In der Maurs of South Tyrol were made barons by Leopold I. The In der Maurs, as part of the Tyrolese lower nobility, owned a schloss and various Ansitze in Kurtatsch an der Weinstraße. In 1615 Caspar Indermaur funded the construction of the Catholic Chapel of St. Anna at Ansitz Strehlburg, one of the In der Maur estates in Kurtatsch.

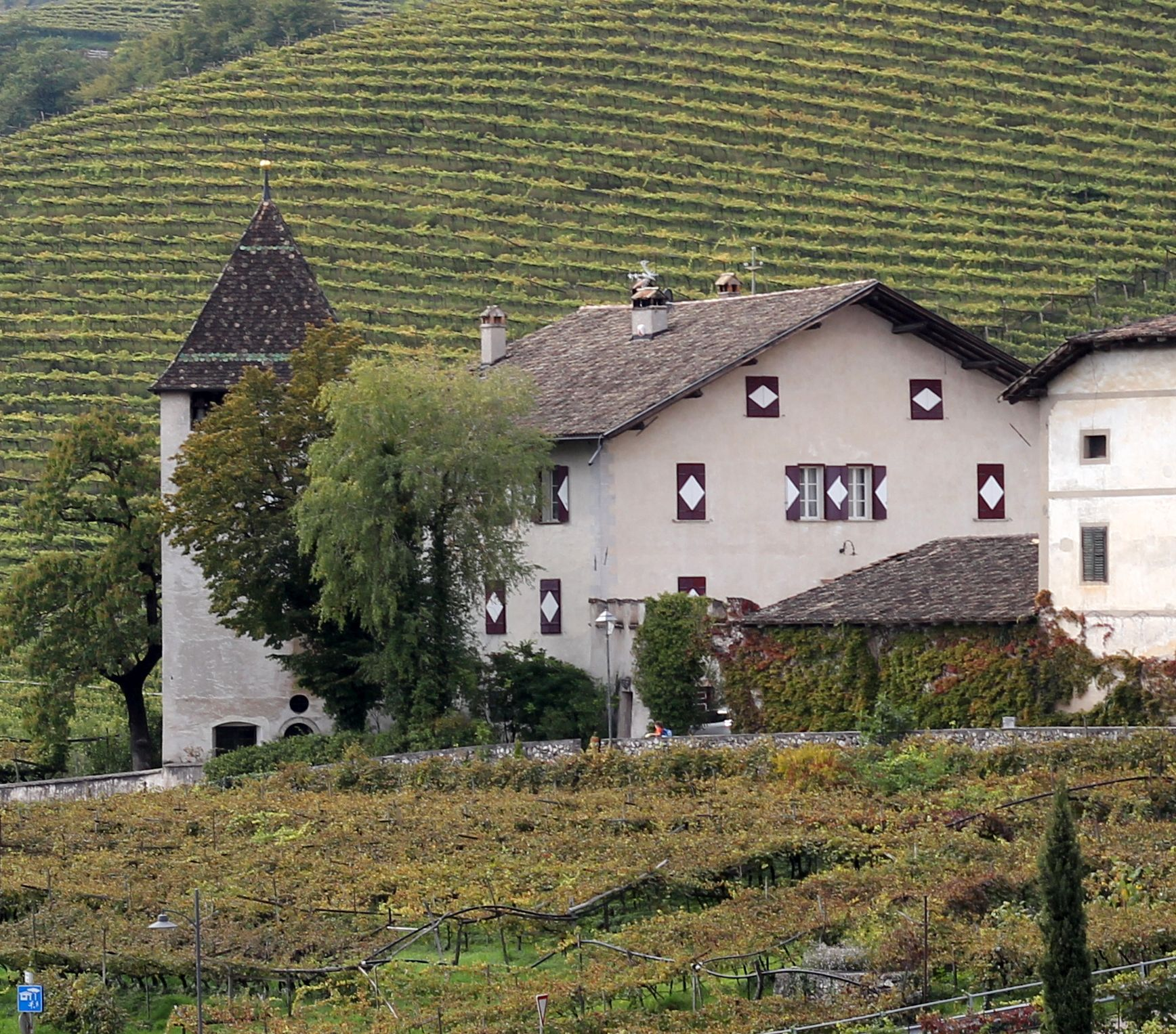
Ansitz Strehlburg and the Chapel of St. Anna.

Baron Caspar von Indermaur held the position of Ober Jägermeister (Master of the hunt).

In 1779, Baron Johann Baptist von Indermaur is listed in Des Hohen Erz-Stifts und Churfürstenthums Trier Hof-, Staats- und Stands-Kalender as a court official in Trier.

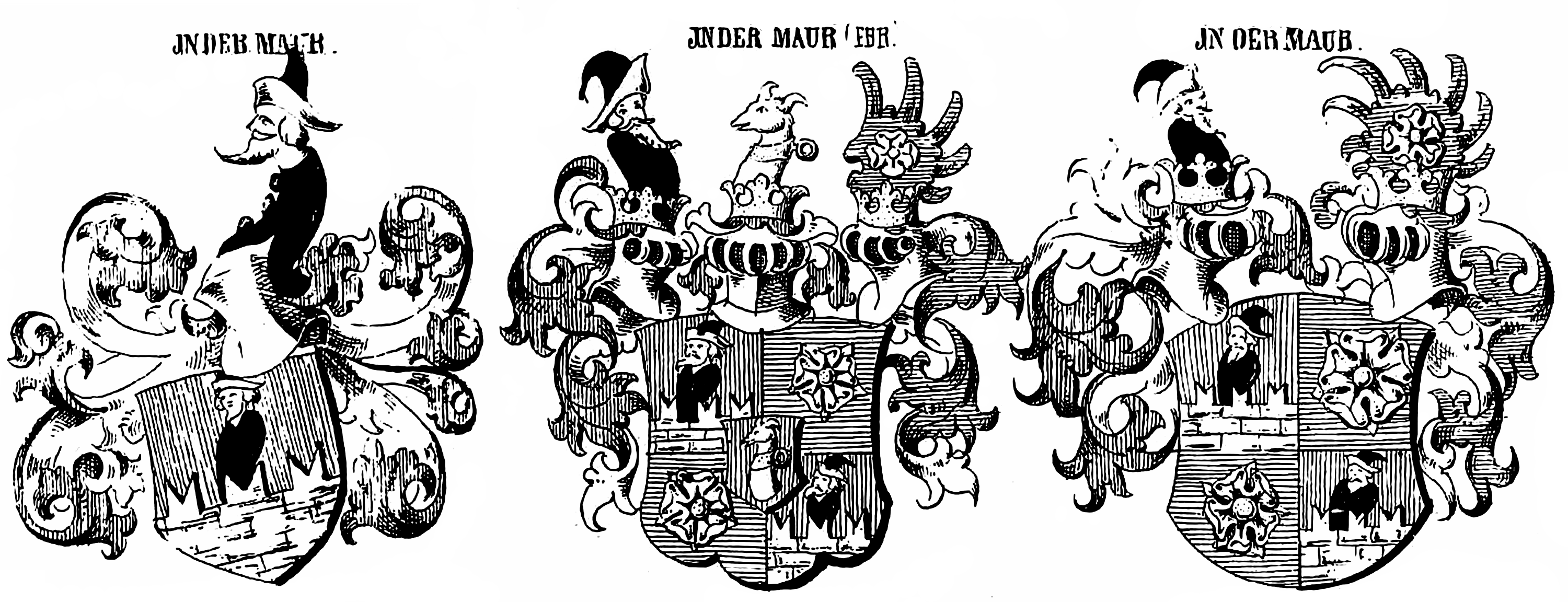
Austrian Indermaur coat of arms

On 19 October 1813 in Munich, Josef Sebastian Anton Indermauer von Freifeld zu Strelburg was granted noble status as a briefadel in the Kingdom of Bavaria through letters patent from Maximilian I Joseph of Bavaria.

Carl von In der Maur, of this line, twice served in the court of Johan II as the Governor of Liechtenstein. He was awarded the Commander's Cross of the Order of Franz Joseph in 1909 for his service in government. He was married to Auguste von Kogerer, the daughter of Austrian courtier Heinrich Ritter von Kogerer. Their son, Gilbert von In der Maur, was a member of the Austrian SS and was married to Countess Maria Gertrude Barbo von Waxenstein, the daughter of Count Josef Anton Barbo von Waxenstein.

=== Rheineck ===
In 1590 Hans Indermaur, a tanner from Berneck, resettled in Rheineck. Indermaur's house was purchased in the 1700s by the municipality of Rheineck and was converted into an orphanage. The building is now a historic landmark and the house's cellar, once used as a tannery, is now a performance venue. As vassals, the In der Maurs were granted fiefdoms and owned vineyards in Berneck and Rheineck. On 19 March 1655, a tanner named Jakob Indermaur von Rheineck was granted a fief near Reben am Schwerzenberg. He was granted another fief, in Strenglen, on 24 June 1689.

The family were granted a second coat of arms in Rheineck, when Johann (Johannes) In der Maur was granted a coat of arms in 1685 depicting a golden lion wielding a blade on a blue shield. Johannes Indermaur von Rheineck was given a fief in Pulberstampf on 1 June 1718. Niklaus Indermaur von Rheineck, the son of a former district governor, was granted a fief in Kugelwies on 4 March 1726 by Johann Jakob Ritter von Ackermann. Heinrich In der Maur was granted a fief in Strenglen on 10 March 1751. Zacharias Indermaur von Rheineck was granted a fiefdom in Pulverstampfe, near Weissgerberwalke, on 12 June 1763.

In the 1800s, members of the family held government administrative positions as court clerks, scribes, and Bezirksammann (district magistrates).

=== The Netherlands and United Kingdom ===
In the middle of the eighteenth century Paulus In der Maur of Berneck (1732–1805) moved from Switzerland to Schoonhoven, South Holland, the Netherlands, thus creating a Dutch branch of the family. His descendants later settled in Utrecht, Gouda, Rotterdam, and Dordrecht. This line included two prominent organ builders, Johann Frederik In der Maur (1790–1836) and Johannes Casper In der Maur (1817–1860). Paulus In der Maur's great-grandson, George In der Maur (1831–1889), moved to Batavia, Dutch East Indies (present-day Jakarta, Indonesia), where he married and had seven children. Christina Antoinette In der Maur (1866–1914), a daughter of George In der Maur, married Johan de Lannoy, a descendent of Eustachius De Lannoy.

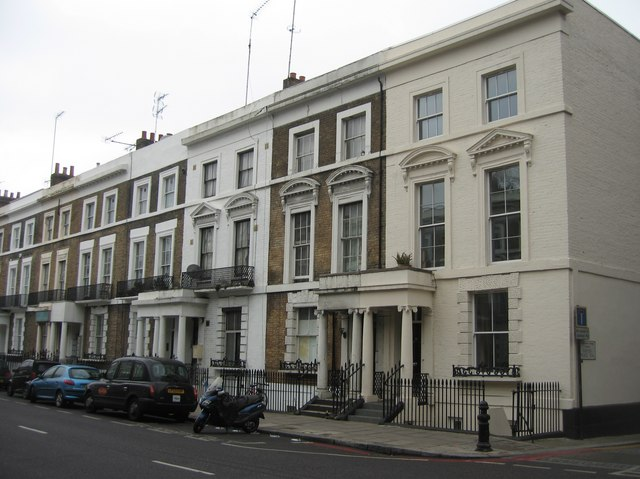
Holland Road in London, where John Indermaur lived.

Johannes In der Maur of Berneck (b. 1748), son of Herman In der Mauer von Berneck (b. 1719) and Anna Schreiberin, moved with his wife Margaretha Oberhausler from Switzerland to England. They had three children; Herman Indermaur (b. 1776), Anna Regula Indermaur (b. 1778), and Henry Indermaur (1788–1848). The English In der Maur line continued with descendants settling in Middlesex and Somerset. In 1904, John Indermaur and Lancelot Indermaur were included in the Royal Blue Book: Court and Parliamentary Guide, a directory published under the patronage of the Edward VII that listed upper-class London residents. In 1936, M.J. Indermaur served as chairman of the Union Helvetia Club in London.

In 1952, Minnie Rose Carpenter (b. 1919) of Gillingham, the wife of David George Indermaur, departed from Southampton with her daughters Barbara Catherine Indermaur (b. 1944) and Jean Elizabeth Indermaur (b. 1949) to join her husband in Melbourne, Victoria, Australia.

== 20th-century to 21st-century ==
The Austrian In der Maurs included the nobiliary particles von (descending from) and zu (resident at) in their surname as von In der Maur auf Strehlburg und zu Freienfeld, referencing two of their principal estates, Strehlburg and Freienfeld, in South Tyrol. The use of nobiliary particles in the surname was maintained until the nobility was abolished in Austria in 1919 and the use of nobiliary particles in the surname became illegal in Austria.

A restaurant in Rorschach, Zum goldenen Fass, was started by Johann Indermaur of Berneck in 1905 and is still owned and operated by the family. The family has owned the Maienhalde, a winery and vineyard in Berneck, for four generations. The In der Maurs owned a furniture manufacturing company and warehouse in Goldach for 105 years. In 2000 the family sold a kitchen business to Ruedi Kälin, Claude Strickler and Rolf Kurath, who incorporated it into the company ASTOR Küchen AG in Einsiedeln.

In 1903, Percival Indermauer, a twenty-seven year old mail clerk from Washington, D.C., was injured during the Wreck of the Old 97 in Danville, Virginia, United States.

In 2018, Katharina In Der Maur was presented as a debutante at the Vienna Opera Ball.

Winemaker and clergyman Felix Indermaur is the Night Watchman of Berneck, authorized by the European Night Watchman and Watchman Guild.

== Notable family members ==
- Ignaz Anton von Indermauer (1759–1796), Vogt of Vorarlberg
- John Indermaur (1851–1925), English lawyer
- Carl von In der Maur (1852–1913), Governor of Liechtenstein
- Gilbert von In der Maur (1887–1959), leading member of the Austrian National Socialist Party
- Edna Indermaur (1892–1985), American opera singer
- Anna Indermaur (1894–1980), Swiss artist
- Wolf In der Maur (1924–2005), Austrian journalist
- Hans-Ulrich Indermaur (b. 1939), Swiss journalist and writer
- Robert Indermaur (b. 1947), Swiss painter and sculptor
- Mirjam Indermaur (b. 1967), Swiss businesswoman and writer
- Rahel Indermaur (b. 1980), Swiss opera singer
- Astrid Perry-Indermaur, Australian women's and immigrant's rights activist
- David Indermaur, Australian psychologist
- Felix Indermaur, Swiss winemaker, clergyman, and Watchman of Berneck
- Rebecca Indermaur, Swiss actress
- Scott Indermaur, American photographer

== Residences ==
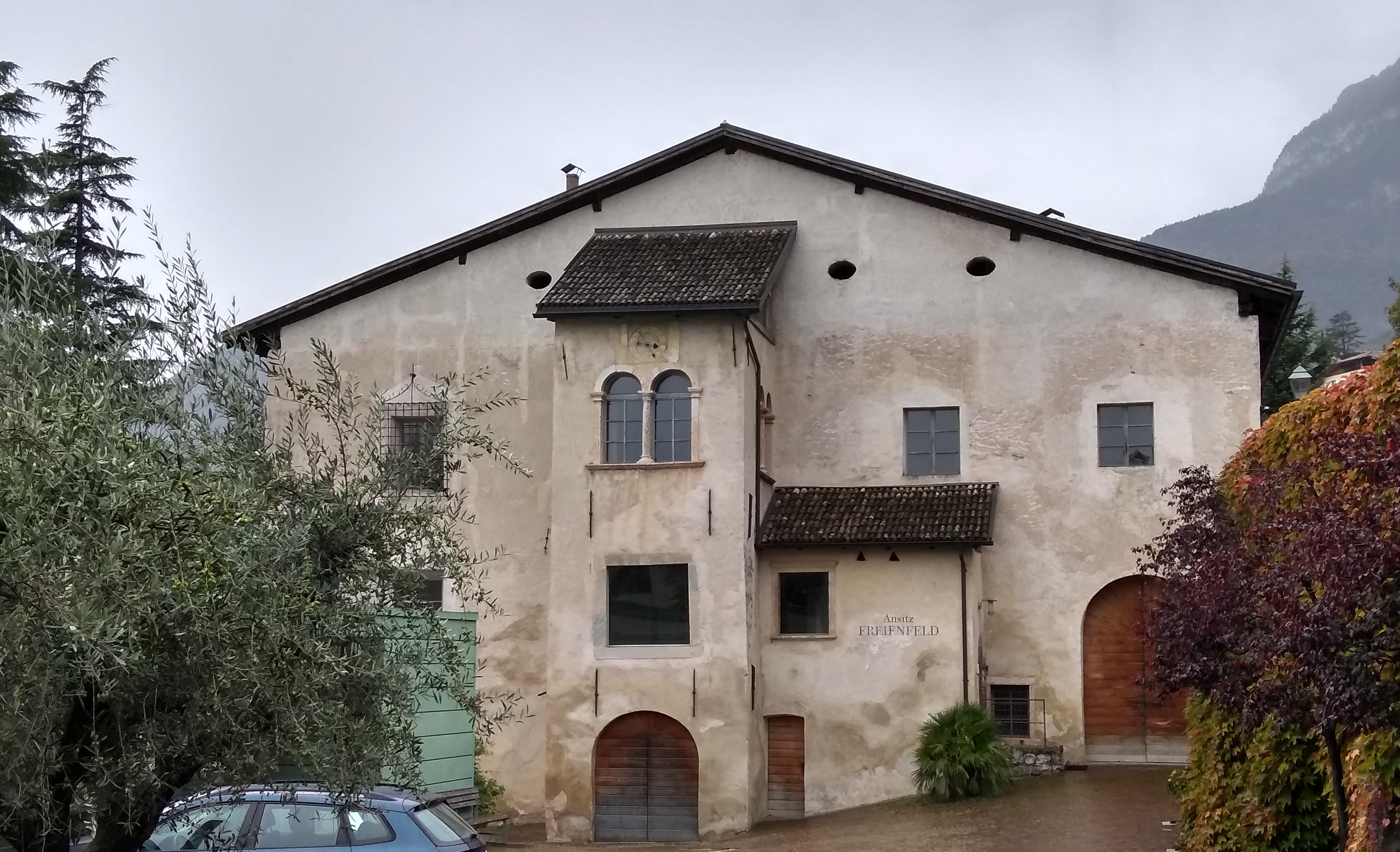
Ansitz Freienfeld in Kurtatsch

- Ansitz Eberlehof, an Ansitz in Kurtatsch an der Weinstraße, Italy
- Finkenhof House, a fortified house in Kurtatsch an der Weinstraße, Italy
- Ansitz Fohrhof, an Ansitz in Kurtatsch an der Weinstraße, Italy
- Ansitz Freienfeld, an Ansitz in Kurtatsch an der Weinstraße, Italy
- Augill Castle, a country house in Cumbria, England
- Nokrische Behausung, a group of houses in Kurtatsch an der Weinstraße, Italy
- Ansitz Nussdorf, an Ansitz in Kurtatsch an der Weinstraße, Italy
- Schloss Nussegg, a castle in Kurtatsch an der Weinstraße, Italy
- Ansitz Strehlburg, an Ansitz in Kurtatsch an der Weinstraße, Italy
- Ansitz Baron von Widmann, an Ansitz in Kurtatsch an der Weinstraße, Italy
