= Ansitz Nussdorf =

Ansitz in South Tyrol

Coordinates: 46.310837°N 11.216325°E

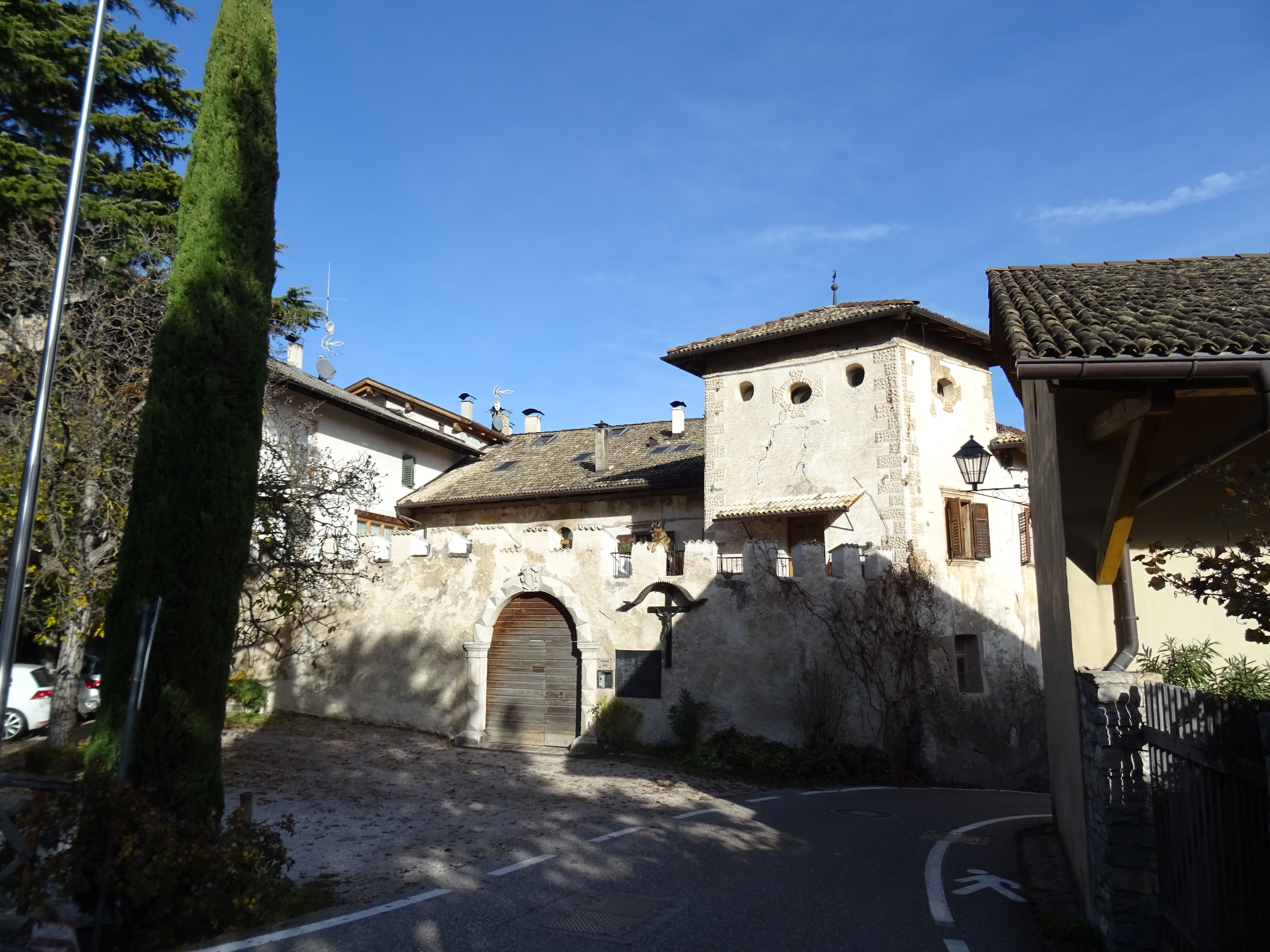
Ansitz Nussdorf

Ansitz Nußdorf (or Ansitz Nussdorf) is an Ansitz in the South Tyrolean Unterland in Italy. The manor was once owned by the Indermaur family, who brought the manor to its present form in 1609. The south-eastern side of the mansion includes a square-shaped tower. Ownership of the estate has changed throughout the centuries. Nussdorf passed from the Indermaur family to the Kager family. The property was purchased by the Manfroni family in 1780 and was later acquired by the Barons von Widmann in 1825.
