= Meinhold =

Meinhold is a surname. Notable people with the name include:

- Bridgette Meinhold, American artist and author
- Carl Meinhold (1926–2019), American basketball player
- Keith Meinhold (born c. 1963), American military personnel
- Ivo Meinhold-Heerlein (born 1969), German gynaecologist, obstetrician and professor
- Wilhelm Meinhold (1797–1851), German priest and author

== See also ==
- Maienhalde
