= List of Swiss Americans =

This list of Swiss Americans includes original immigrants who obtained American citizenship, and their American descendants.

To be included in this list, subjects must have a Wikipedia article showing they are Swiss American or must have references showing they are Swiss Americans and are notable.

== Pioneers ==
- J. Presper Eckert (1919–1995), computer pioneer, co-designed the ENIAC
- Peter Luginbill (1818–1886), born in France as the son of Mennonite parents exiled from the Emmental, early settler in Indiana and founder of the city of Berne
- John Sutter (1803–1880), born in Germany of a Swiss father, Californian famous for his association with the California Gold Rush (in that gold was discovered by James W. Marshall in Sutter's Mill) and for establishing Sutter's Fort in an area that would later become the capital of California, Sacramento
  - John Augustus Sutter, Jr. (1826–1897), his son, a U.S. Consul to Acapulco, Mexico and the founder and planner of the City of Sacramento, California
- Theobald (Diebold) von Erlach (1541–1565), first Swiss person known to have settled in North America.
- Wright brothers, aviation pioneers, mother of partial Swiss descent
- Louis Chevrolet, co-founder of Chevrolet Motor Car Company in 1911
- John Joachim Zubly (1724–1781) of St. Gallen, pastor, planter, and statesman during the American Revolution

== List by occupation ==
=== Business ===
- Robert Abplanalp (1922–2003), businessman, inventor of the aerosol valve
- Steve Ballmer (born 1956), businessman and CEO of Microsoft Corporation
- Henry Clay Frick (1849–1919), industrialist and art patron, once known as "America's most hated man". as per CNBC one of the "Worst American CEOs of All Time".
- Meyer Guggenheim (1828–1905), statesman, patriarch of Guggenheim family
- Simon Guggenheim (1867–1941), businessman, politician, and philanthropist
- Steve Jobs (1955–2011), information technology entrepreneur and inventor
- Milton Hershey (1857–1945), confectioner, philanthropist, and founder of The Hershey Chocolate Company
- Otto Frederick Hunziker (1873–1959), pioneer in the American and international dairy industry
- S. S. Kresge (1867–1966), merchant, philanthropist and founder of the S. S. Kresge Company, now Sears Holdings Corporation.
- Robert Lutz (born 1932), General Motors Vice Chairman of Product Development and Chairman of GM North America, the world's largest automaker
- Mark Spitznagel (born 1971), hedge fund manager
- James G. Sterchi (1867–1932), furniture store magnate
- Bruce Tognazzini (born 1945), usability consultant in partnership the Nielsen Norman Group
- Albert Lee Ueltschi (1917–2012), considered the father of modern flight training and was the founder of FlightSafety

=== Arts and entertainment ===
==== Actors and directors ====
- René Murat Auberjonois (1940–2019), film actor
- Theda Bara (1885–1955), silent film actress and sex symbol
- Wallace Beery (1885–1949), film actor
- Berry Berenson (1948–2001), photographer, actress, and model, mother of part Swiss descent
- Marisa Berenson (born 1947), actress and model
- Amy Brenneman (born 1964), film and TV actress, father of part Swiss descent
- Jeff Bridges (born 1949), actor, singer, and producer
- Yul Brynner (1920–1985), actor, father of part Swiss descent
- James Caviezel (born 1968), film actor, paternal grandfather of Swiss descent
- Emily Deschanel (born 1976), actress, director, and producer
- Billie Dove (1903–1997), film actress
- Robert Downey Jr. (born 1965), actor, mother of partial Swiss descent
- Jon Hall (1915–1979), actor, Swiss father
- Nina Hartley (born 1959), porn actress and director
- David Hayter (born 1969), actor and voice actor
- Tyler Hoechlin (born 1987), film actor, father of part Swiss descent
- Melia Kreiling (born 1990), actress
- Q'Orianka Kilcher (born 1990), singer and actress, of part Swiss descent
- Taylor Lautner (born 1992), actor
- Karina Lombard (born 1969), actress
- George Lucas (born 1944), film director, of part Swiss descent
- Bridget Marquardt (born 1975), model, actress
- Victor Mature (1913–1999), film actor
- Nick Offerman (born 1970), actor, writer, comedian, and professional carpenter
- Jodi Ann Paterson (born 1975), model, actress and former beauty queen
- Michelle Pfeiffer (born 1958), film actress, maternal grandfather of Swiss descent
- Ryan Potter (born 1995), actor, mother of part Swiss descent
- Chris Pratt (born 1979), actor
- Ben Pronsky (born 1978), voice actor
- Kelly Rohrbach (born 1990), model and actress
- Ryan Seacrest (born 1974), television and radio host, television producer, and entrepreneur, of part Swiss descent
- August Schellenberg (1936–2013), actor
- Liev Schreiber (born 1967), film actor, father of part Swiss descent
- Meryl Streep (born 1949), film actress, father of part Swiss descent
- Evelyn Ward (1923–2012), actress
- Paul Walker (1973–2013), actor
- William Wyler (1902–1981), film director
- Darryl F. Zanuck (1902–1979), film producer and director
- Renée Zellweger (born 1969), film actress, Swiss-born father
- Denis Ooi, actor, Swiss-British-United States citizen

==== Visual artists ====
- Scott Indermaur, photographer
- Herbert Matter (1907–1984), photographer and graphic designer
- Adolfo Müller-Ury (1862–1947), portrait and impressionistic still-life painter
- Jeremiah Theus (1716–1774) of Chur, painter

John Hafen (1856-1910), artist

==== Writers and publicists ====
- Fernand Auberjonois (1910–2004), journalist, foreign correspondent of the Pittsburgh Post-Gazette and the Toledo Blade
- Lisa Brennan-Jobs (born 1978), writer, daughter of Steve Jobs
- William F. Buckley Jr. (1925–2008), writer
- Henry J. Eyring, author, educator, president of Brigham Young University-Idaho
- Sofia Samatar (born 1971), poet and writer
- Mona Simpson (born 1957), novelist
- Wendy Watson Nelson, Canadian-American, author, lecturer, educator, associate professor at University of Calgary
- Tessa Gräfin von Walderdorff (born 1994), writer and socialite
- Eudora Alice Welty (1909–2001), writer; ancestry can be traced to Emmental Valley of Switzerland; Swiss ancestral name Wälti

==== Musicians ====
- Melissa Auf der Maur (born 1972), singer
- Leon Botstein (born 1946), conductor
- Rudolph Ganz (1877–1972), pianist, conductor and composer
- Edna Indermaur (1892–1985), singer
- Yung Gravy (born 1996), rapper, songwriter and producer
- Jewel (born 1974), singer-songwriter, actress, philanthropist, and author
- Cyndi Lauper (born 1953), singer-songwriter and actress
- Karina Lombard (born 1969), singer and actress
- Madonna (born 1958), singer and actress
- Elvis Perkins (born 1976), singer-songwriter
- Tom Petty (1950–2017), singer-songwriter, musician, record producer, and actor
- Dee Snider (born 1955), singer-songwriter
- Tina Turner (1939–2023), singer-songwriter and actress (relinquished U.S. citizenship in 2013)
- Eddie Vedder (born 1964), singer-songwriter and musician
- Adam Yauch "MCA" (1964–2012), rapper, bass player, filmmaker, and founding member of the hip hop group Beastie Boys

==== Other ====
- Mary Katherine Campbell (1905–1990), only Miss America winner to hold beauty title twice, 1922 & 1923; mother was of partial Swiss ancestry
- Gary Gygax (1938–2008), writer and game designer, co-creator of Dungeons & Dragons
- Sid Meier (born 1954), prominent video game programmer and designer of the video game series Civilization

=== Law and politics ===
==== Governors and presidents ====
- Anthony Brown (born 1961), Lieutenant Governor of Maryland
- Dwight D. Eisenhower (1890–1969), President of the United States
- Herbert Hoover (1874–1964), President of the United States
- Madeleine Kunin (1985–1991), Governor of Vermont
- Robert B. Meyner (1908–1990), Governor of New Jersey
- Barack Obama (born 1961), President of the United States (distant ancestors)
- Emanuel L. Philipp (1861–1925), Governor of Wisconsin
- Gretchen Whitmer (born 1971), Governor of Michigan

==== Congressmembers and senators ====
- James L. Buckley (1923–2023), Senator from New York
- Albert Gallatin (1761–1849), U.S. Secretary of the Treasury, Senator of Pennsylvania, diplomat
- James William Good (1866–1929), Congressman Iowa
- Herbert Hoover Jr. (1903–1960), Under Secretary of State
- Amy Klobuchar (born 1960), Senator from Minnesota
- James S. Negley (1826–1901), Congressman Pennsylvania
- Robert Portman (born 1955), Senator from Ohio
- Benjamin F. Welty (1870–1962), Congressman from Allen County, Ohio; ancestry traced back to Emmental Valley, Switzerland; Swiss ancestral name Wälti

==== Other ====
- Warren E. Burger (1907–1995), Chief Justice of the United States from 1969 to 1986
- Tucker Carlson (born 1969), political commentator and talk show host
- August Claessens (1885–1954), politician, best known as one of the five New York Assemblymen
- Albert Gallatin (1761–1849), politician, ethnologist, linguist, founder of New York University, diplomat, and United States Secretary of the Treasury
- Arthur L. Gilliom (1886–1968), Indiana Attorney General from 1925 to 1929
- Fred Iklé (1924–2011), Under Secretary of Defense for Policy
- Thomas M. Honan (1867–1932), Speaker of the Indiana House of Representatives (from 1908 to 1910) and Indiana Attorney General (from 1911 to 1915)
- J. Edgar Hoover (1935–1972), first Director of the FBI
- Madeline Kunin (born 1933), U.S. Ambassador to Liechtenstein (1997–1999), U.S. Ambassador to Switzerland (1996–1999), U.S. Deputy Secretary of Education (1993–1996), Lieutenant Governor of Vermont (1979–1983), Vermont State Representative (1973–1979)
- Wally Schirra (1923–2007), astronaut, only person to fly in all of America's first three space programs (Mercury, Gemini and Apollo)
- Joseph A. Shakspeare (1837–1896), politician, elected mayor of New Orleans from 1880 to 1882
- Samuel F. Snively (1859–1952), Mayor of Duluth, Minnesota
- Peter Staub (1827–1904), Mayor of Knoxville, Tennessee
- Mike Thompson (born 1951), California House of Representatives
- Peter Urscheler (born 1983), Mayor of Phoenixville, Pennsylvania; first-generation American born to a Swiss father and Filipina mother.
- William Wirt (1772–1834), author and statesman who is credited with turning the position of United States Attorney General into one of influence; Swiss father.
- Henry Wisner (1720–1790), patriot leader during the American Revolution and New York representative in the Continental Congress.
- Dan Zumbach (born 1960), Iowa Senator
- John D. Imboden (born 1823), Virginia state legislator
- Rui Xu (born 1989), Kansas state legislator

=== Military ===
- Henry Bouquet, prominent Army officer in the French and Indian War and Pontiac's War
- Edward Walter Eberle (1864–1929), admiral in the United States Navy, served as Superintendent of the United States Naval Academy and third Chief of Naval Operations
- Al Ulmer (1916-2000), a major head of U.S. intelligence operations during World War II and part of the Cold War
- Henry Wirz (1822–1865), only Confederate soldier executed in the aftermath of the American Civil War for war crimes
- Felix Zollicoffer (1812–1862), newspaperman, three-term US Congressman from Tennessee, officer in the United States Army, and a Confederate brigadier general during the American Civil War

=== Religion ===
- Henry B. Eyring (born 1933), educator, Stanford University professor, Presiding Elder of the Church of Jesus Christ of Latter-day Saints
- Daniel Kumler Flickinger (1824–1911), Bishop of the Church of the United Brethren in Christ
- Martin Marty (1834–1886), Benedictine priest
- Philip Schaff (1819–1893), Protestant theologian and a historian of the Christian church

=== Scientists and engineers ===
- Alexander Emanuel Agassiz (1835–1910), geologist and zoologist
- Louis Agassiz (1807–1873), zoologist, glaciologist, and geologist, the husband of educator Elizabeth Cabot Cary Agassiz, and one of the first world-class American scientists
- Berni Alder (1925–2020), physicist
- David Alter (1807–1881), inventor, almost discovered spectroscopy
- Othmar Ammann (1879–1965), civil engineer
- Adolph Francis Alphonse Bandelier (1840–1914), archeologist
- Felix Bloch (1905–1983), physicist
- Armand Borel (1923–2003), mathematician
- Wilhelm (Willy) Burgdorfer (1925–2014), medical entomologist
- Hans R. Camenzind (1934–2012), inventor of the 555 timer IC
- Florian Cajori (1859–1930), mathematician
- Robert Frank (1924–2019), important figure in American photography and film
- Albert Einstein (1879–1955), theoretical physicist widely regarded as the most important scientist of the 20th century and one of the greatest physicists of all time
- Henry Eyring (1901–1981), Mexican born American, theoretical chemist, associate of Albert Einstein
- Edmond H. Fischer (1920–2021), biochemist
- Walter Gautschi (born 1927), mathematician
- Otto Frederick Hunziker (1873–1959), dairy educator and technologist
- Josias Joesler (1895–1927), architect
- John Kruesi (1843–1899), inventor and close associate of Thomas Edison
- Adolf Meyer (1866–1950), psychiatrist
- Jean Piccard (1884–1963), scientist and high-altitude balloonist
- Louis François de Pourtalès (1824–1880), naturalist
- Adolph Rickenbacker (1886–1976), pioneer of the electric guitar; founder of the Rickenbacker guitar company, whose products would be an important influence on 1960s music through, among others, The Beatles, The Who and The Byrds
- Eddie Rickenbacker (1890–1973), automobile race car driver and automotive designer, hero of World War I, government consultant in military matters and a pioneer in air transportation
- Louis Sullivan (1856–1924), American architect, and has been called a "father of skyscrapers"
- Max Theiler (1899–1972), virologist, awarded the Nobel Prize in Physiology or Medicine for developing a vaccine against yellow fever

=== Sports ===
- Valeri Bure (born 1974), former ice hockey player, naturalized American citizen
- Martin Buser (born 1958), champion of sled dog racing
- Louis Chevrolet (1878–1941), racing driver; founder of the Chevrolet Motor Car Company, now the most famous brand of General Motors
- Joey Daccord (born 1996), NHL goaltender currently playing for the Ottawa Senators; born in Boston to a Swiss mother
- Phil Dalhausser (born 1980), Olympic beach volleyball champion; born in Baden to German father and Swiss mother
- Brett Favre (born 1969), former NFL quarterback
- Bobby Fischer (1943–2008), controversial world chess champion
- Dan Fritsche (born 1985), former ice hockey player
- Pudge Heffelfinger (1867–1954), first professional football player
- Jeff Hostetler (born 1961), quarterback in the NFL for the New York Giants, Los Angeles/Oakland Raiders, and Washington Redskins.
- Aidan Hutchinson (born 2000), defensive end for the Detroit Lions; great-grandfather from Medeglia
- Fred Merkle (1888–1956), baseball player
- Alexia Paganini (born 2001), figure skater, Swiss father
- Alexander Ritschard (born 1994), tennis player, naturalized American citizen
- Ben Roethlisberger (born 1982), quarterback in the NFL for the Pittsburgh Steelers
- Simone Schaller (1912–2016), Olympic hurdler, Swiss father
- Cory Schneider (born 1986), NHL goaltender
- Olivier Vernon (born 1990), NFL defensive end; mother emigrated from Uzwil
- Rudolph "Minnesota Fats" Wanderone (1913–1996), perhaps the best known pool player in the United States
- Ben Zobrist, second baseman in Major League Baseball

=== Other ===
- Helen Keller (1880–1968), author, political activist and lecturer; first deafblind person to earn a Bachelor of Arts degree
- Christoph Meili (born 1968), whistleblower
- Chesley Sullenberger (born 1951), airline transport pilot who successfully carried out the emergency ditching of US Airways Flight 1549 in the Hudson River, saving the lives of the 155 people on the aircraft

== See also ==
- List of Amish and their descendants
