= Ansitz Strehlburg =

Ansitz in South Tyrol

Coordinates: 46.3112°N 11.220447°E

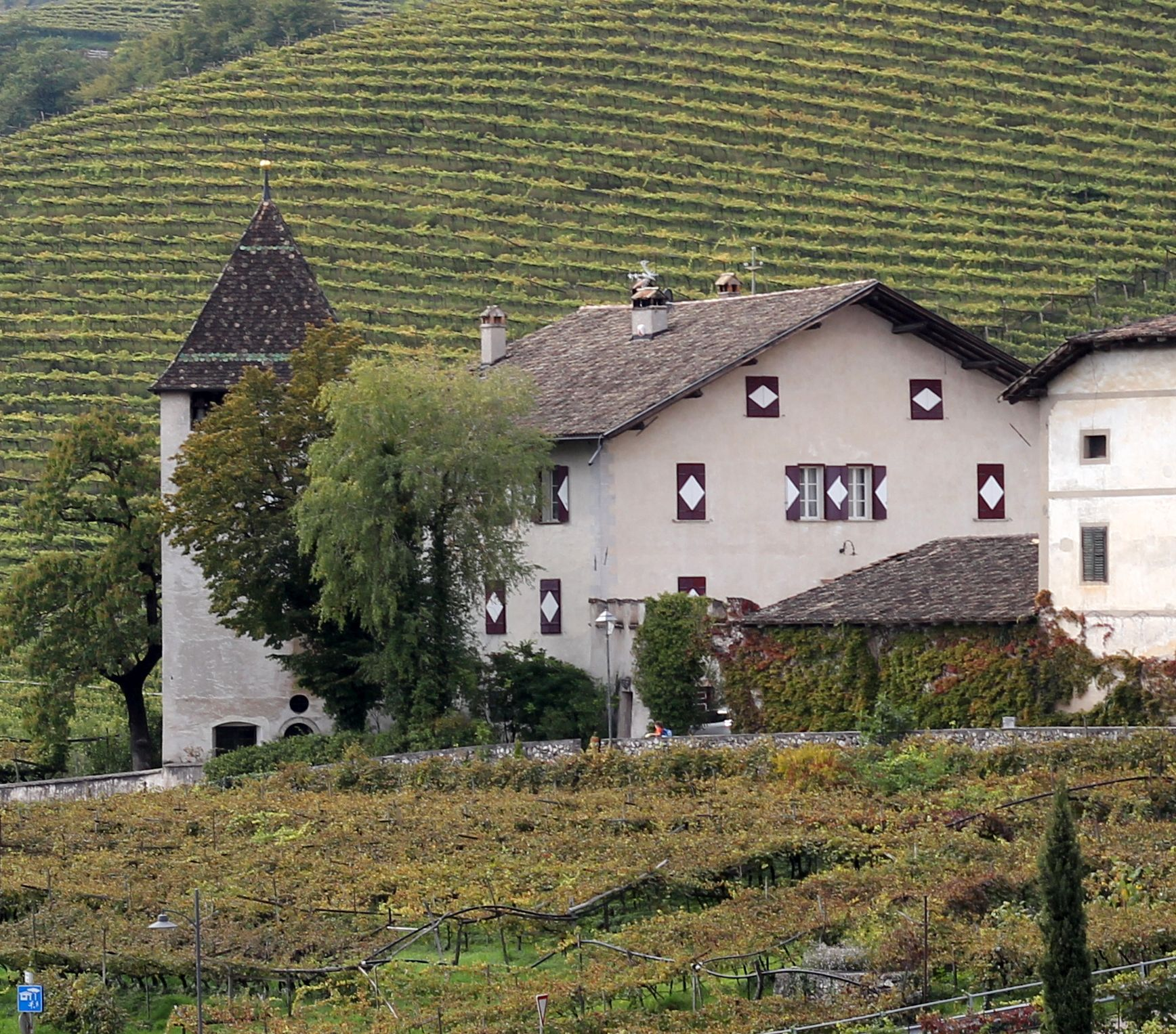
- Ansitz Strehlburg with chapel
- Alternative names: Strehlburg, Strellenhof

General information
- Type: Manor / Ansitz
- Location: Kurtatsch an der Weinstraße, South Tyrol, Italy
- Construction started: 1492
- Owner: In der Maur family (historical), later von Fenner, Carli

Ansitz Strehlburg is an Ansitz in Kurtatsch an der Weinstraße, South Tyrol that was one of the main estates, along with Ansitz Freienfeld, of the In der Maur family. The estate is located at the entrance of Kurtatsch and was built in 1492. It includes a large manor house with a tower, farm buildings, stables, a central courtyard, a chapel, and a fortified wall. In the middle of the 15th century, Heinrich Indermaur's daughter married Stephen Strele in Kurtatsch. His name became tiled to the manor. It was called Strele, Strelen, and Strellenhof. When the Indermaur were ennobled within the Holy Roman Empire, Kaspar Indermaur changed the name to Strehlburg. Kaspar Indermaur established the farm as a manor around 1600. It was later expanded in the 18th century.

Kaspar Indermaur built a Catholic chapel, dedicated to St. Anna, on the ground floor of the tower at Strehlburg. The chapel has a large painting of St. George on one of the outside walls. Strehlburg was later owned by the von Fenner in 1763 and the Carli in 1841.
