= Joachim Opser =

Swiss abbot

Joachim Opser (born c. 1548 in Wil; died 24 August 1594 in St. Gallen) was abbot of the Abbey of Saint Gall from 1577 until 1594.

== Life ==
Joachim's father Michael was chancellor of the prince-abbot; he moved to Wil for confessional reasons. Joachim took his vows on 17 June 1563. He started studying at the university of Dillingen in 1564 and then studied at the Paris Jesuit College between 1570 and 1574. In Paris, he became witness to the St. Bartholomew's Day massacre and in two letters to the Saint Gall Abbot Otmar Kunz he told about the violent events. He was listed as deacon of Saint Gall on 8 April 1576 and was elected abbot on 29 January 1577. The papal confirmation was conferred by Gregory XIII on 16 April 1578, while the benediction was performed by the Auxiliary Bishop Balthasar Wurer of Konstanz on 24 June 1578. On 27 November 1578, Joachim Opser was chosen by Beatus a Porta and the Chur cathedral chapter to be an auxiliary bishop and thus also designated successor of the acting bishop. However, he was met with strong opposition because he did not come from one of the Three Leagues and thus had to forego his appointment to Chur. In 1591, he had the market hall in Berneck, St. Gallen demolished and ordered the town hall to be built in its place.

== Works ==
During his abbacy at Saint Gall, Joachim Opser repeatedly received papal nuncios, who on their visitations called for reforms after the model of the council of Trent. Joachim indeed seems to have demanded stern discipline from his monks as a result. Apparently this led to open conflict in one part of the convent in 1590. The abbot was accused of demanding a level of discipline from his subordinates he was not subject to himself. The nuncio in Lucerne launched an investigation which concluded that those accusations were baseless. Nevertheless, Abbot Joachim was forced to loosen his policy of uncompromising discipline.

During Joachim Opsers abbacy, the abbey was in a state of financial distress, which necessitated the sale of estates in Neu-Ravensburg and Wangen im Allgäu. The abbey's financial hardship was exacerbated by the plague which was spreading in 1594 and caused many monks to leave the abbey. Abbot Joachim stayed in Saint Gall and died during a sermon on 24 August 1594. He was buried on the left side of the minster choir by the altar of Saint Benedict. His legacy consists of the reformist document Liber exercitiorum spiritualium.
