= Bernhard Müller (disambiguation) =

The following people were named Bernhard Müller:

- Bernhard Müller (abbot) (1537–1630) Abbot of the monastery of St. Gall
- Bernhard Müller (1788–1834) also known as Count de Leon German mystic
- Bernhard Müller (general) (* 1957) Swiss general
