= Ansitz Freienfeld =

Ansitz in South Tyrol

Coordinates: 46.31469°N 11.22145°E

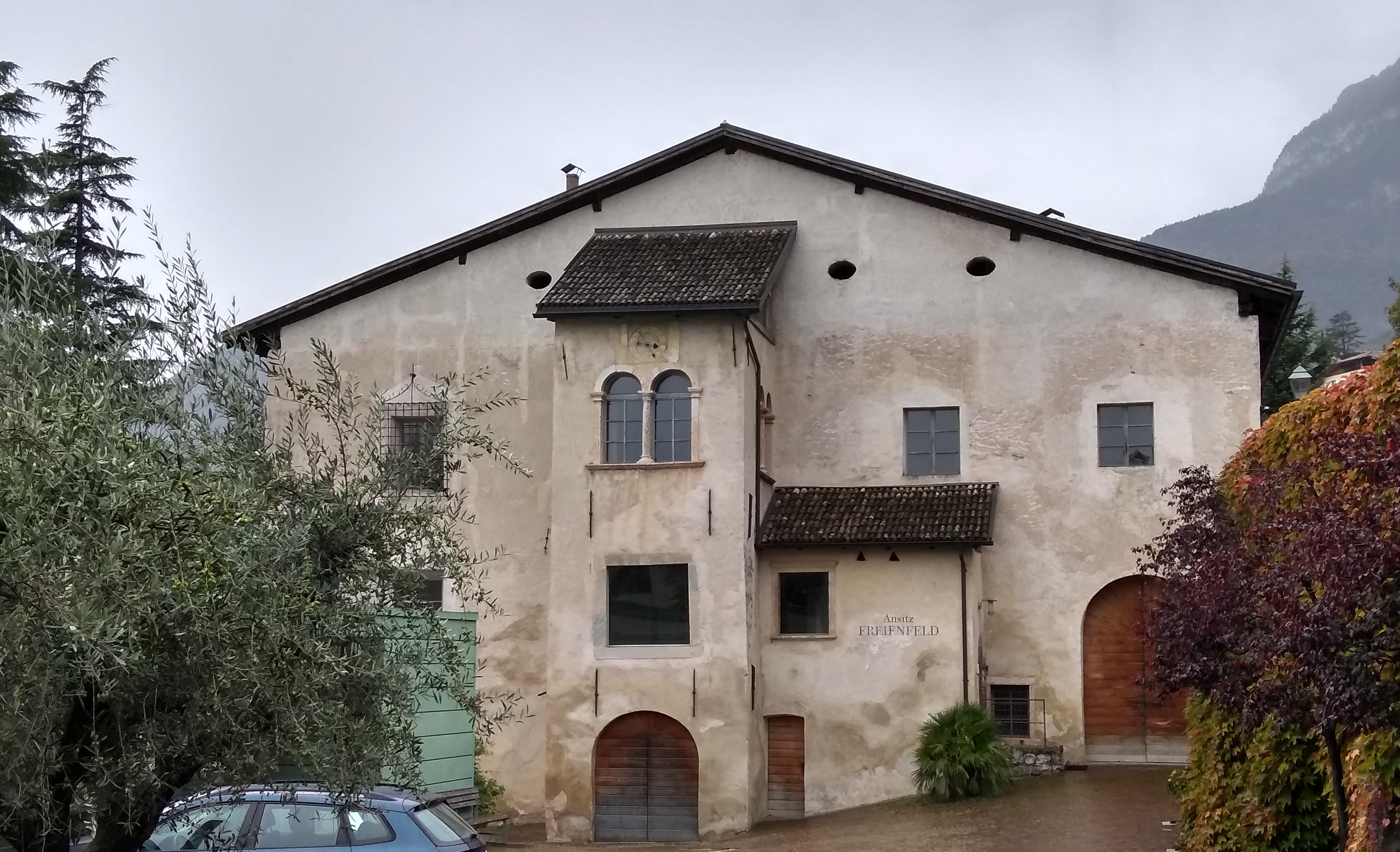
Freienfeld in Kurtatsch

Ansitz Freienfeld is an Ansitz located in Kurtatsch an der Weinstraße, South Tyrol, Italy. The manor was built in 1521 and has undergone several expansions, renovations, and changes in ownership. It is currently used by a winery to store barriques. It was one of the principal manors, along with Ansitz Strehlburg, of the In der Maur family.

== History ==
Ansitz Freienfeld was constructed in 1521 in Kurtatsch an der Weinstraße, possibly by local judge Christian Truefer. It is also possible that it later underwent a comprehensive renovation in the Gothic style. Around 1610 an enlargement was made to the western portion of the building. In 1619 a western annex was constructed. In 1640 the manor was acquired by the In der Maur zu Strehlburg and Freudenfeld. From 1675 it was possessed by the Millstetter zu Milpach family, changing hands to the Enzenberg family in 1777, then being reacquired by the In der Maur zu Strehlburg and Freudenfeld family in 1780, before becoming the home of the Anrather family in 1825.

In 1900 Ansitz Freienfeld became the headquarters of the newly created Kellerei Kurtatsch winery. However, in 1903 the manor was acquired by the village of Kurtatsch. The winery business quickly grew and in 1920 was moved into a new purpose-built structure in a different part of the village. The Kellerei Kurtatsch rented out space in the manor's cellars in the 21st century to store barriques for wine fermentation. It is also used for wine tours. A wine produced by the business, Freienfeld, was named after the manor. The winery hosts an annual party in the cellars centered around red wine.

== Nokrische Behausung ==
Nokrische Behausung are a group of houses located near Freienfeld. The houses were likely built by the lords of In der Maur, along with Freienfeld, at the beginning of the 16th century. The entry gate to the houses, built in 1623, was originally the gate to Freienfeld. The lower levels of the houses contained a smithy and a tinsmith. Ownership changed from the In der Maur to the Nocker in 1687, then the von Wohlgemuth in 1780. They were bought by the Christoforetti in 1852.
