= Aeolian Building (42nd Street) =

Building in Manhattan, New York

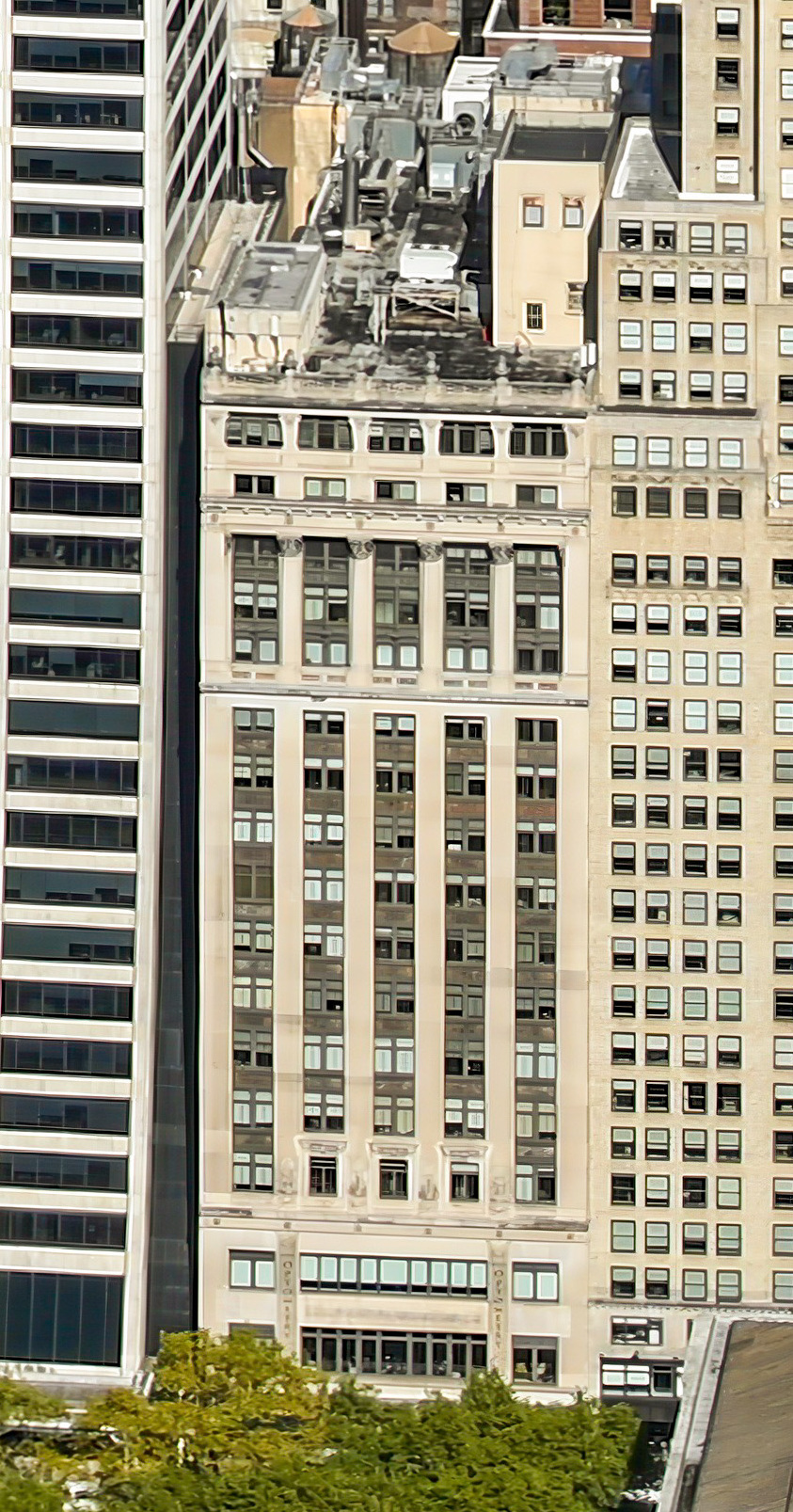
- Viewed from the Empire State Building, 2025

General information
- Location: Manhattan, New York City
- Coordinates: 40.7544°N 73.9822°W
- Opened: 1912

Height
- Height: 260 ft (79 m)

Technical details
- Floor count: 17

Design and construction
- Architect: Warren and Wetmore

The Aeolian Building is a skyscraper in Midtown Manhattan in New York City, at 29–33 West 42nd Street and 34 West 43rd Street, just north of Bryant Park. The 1912 building was the fourth headquarters of the Aeolian Company, which manufactured pianos and other musical instruments. (Note: The earlier buildings, all in Manhattan, were at 831 Broadway (1887–91), 18 West 23rd Street (1891–1902), and 362 Fifth Avenue (1902–12).) The 17-story building contained the 1,100-seat Aeolian Hall (1912–1927), a first-ranked concert hall of its day.

== History ==
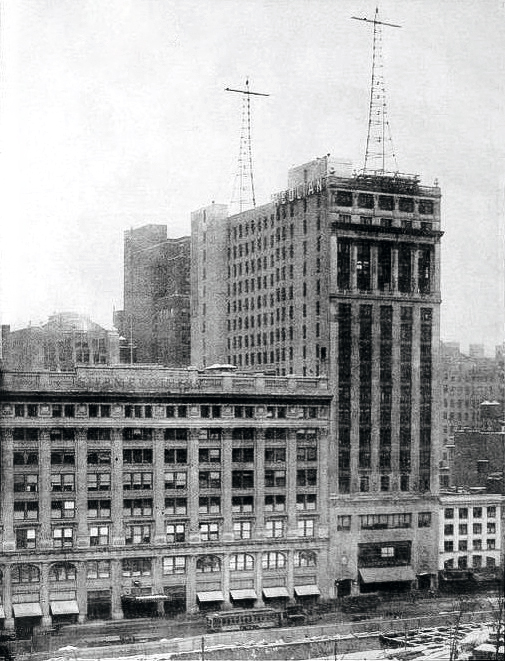
Aeolian Hall in 1923

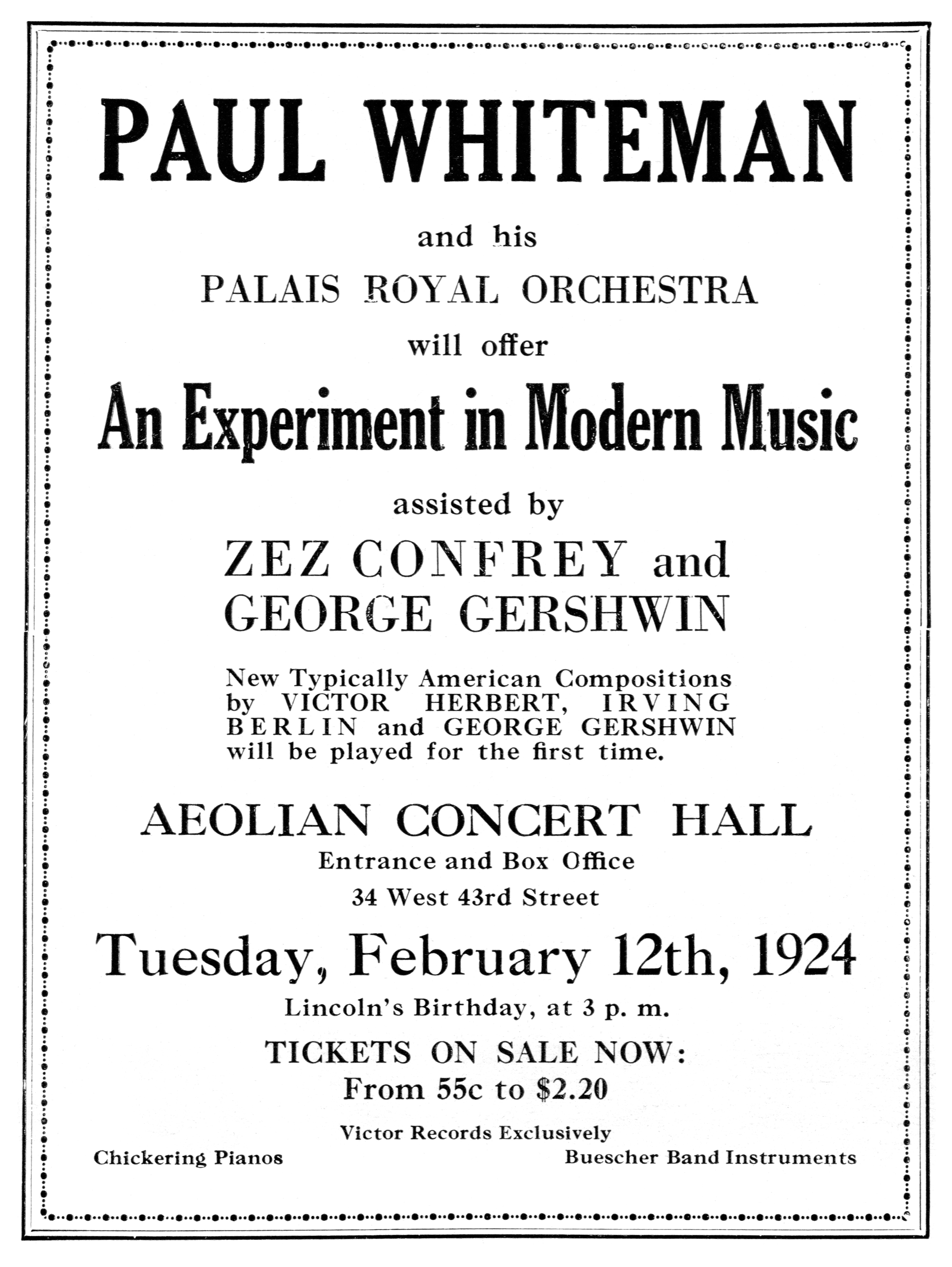
Advertisement for An Experiment in Modern Music in the March 1924 issue of Theatre Magazine

The building, on the site of the Latting Tower, a popular observatory during the 19th century, was designed by the architects Whitney Warren and Charles Wetmore and completed in 1912. Its name refers to the Aeolian Company, which manufactured pianos. It is 260 feet (79 m) high and has 18 floors. In mid-1922, the company sold the building to the Schulte Cigar Stores Company for over $5 million.

From 1961 to 1999, the building housed the Graduate Center of the City University of New York, and today houses the State University of New York's College of Optometry; it is located next to the W. R. Grace Building.

== Aeolian Hall ==
The concert hall, which could seat 1,100 spectators, was on the 43rd Street side of the building, on the first and second floors.

The New York Symphony Society performed concerts in both Aeolian Hall and Carnegie Hall, but moved in 1924 to the new Mecca Auditorium on 55th Street. In 1923 American contralto Edna Indermaur made her singing debut at Aeolian Hall.

From 1923 to 1926 the WJZ (now WABC) studios were at Aeolian Hall, with transmission towers atop the building.

Aeolian Hall also featured concerts by leading musical figures such as William Grant Still, Ottorino Respighi, Sergei Rachmaninoff, Beniamino Riccio, Josef Hofmann, Sergei Prokofiev, Ferruccio Busoni, Guiomar Novaes, Rebecca Clarke, May Mukle, Ignacy Jan Paderewski and Vladimir Rosing, as well as Paul Whiteman and His Orchestra. Upon its return to the United States after several years in Europe, the Zoellner Quartet gave its first New York performance there on January 7, 1914.

The hall is most famous for a concert given by Whiteman's orchestra on February 12, 1924, titled "An Experiment in Modern Music". Intended to be an educational demonstration on how far American music had progressed in recent decades and how jazz could be performed in the concert hall, the concert included a suite by Victor Herbert and closed with the Pomp and Circumstance Marches by Edward Elgar. The concert is remembered, however, for the penultimate piece, the world premiere of George Gershwin's Rhapsody in Blue with the composer at the piano, orchestrated by Whiteman's arranger Ferde Grofé. This concert is today considered a defining event of the Jazz Age and the cultural history of New York City.

The building continued to host concerts by the International Composers' Guild up to January 1926, at least, when the appearance of African American Broadway performer Florence Mills, singing jazz-based pieces by William Grant Still, caused a minor sensation. Nadezhda Plevitskaya reportedly delighted the Aeolian Hall audience with her Russian folk songs in April 1926.

The concert hall closed in May 1927, with a performance by violinist Leon Goldman.
