= Hans-Ulrich Indermaur =

Swiss journalist and writer

Hans-Ulrich Indermaur (born 29 November 1939) is a Swiss magazine editor, television reporter, and author. As a reporter and moderator for the television program Telearena, he moderated a heated debate about homosexuality in Switzerland in 1978. Later that year, Indermaur was appointed as the editor-in-chief of the Swiss magazine TELE, serving in that capacity until 2003.

== Biography ==
Indermaur was born on 29 November 1939 and lives in Zürich. He is a member of the In der Maur family. He worked as a television reporter and moderator for Telearena in the 1970s, covering topics including incarceration and homosexuality. Indermaur moderated a debate on homosexuality, including lesbian relationships and civil recognition, on Telearena on 12 April 1978. The debate, which became heated, was between openly gay people and critics of homosexuality.

Indermaur was editor-in-chief of the Swiss magazine TELE from 1978 until 2003. He also worked as a consultant for the magazine and was on TELE's sales team.

He wrote a book titled Aber Pappa. Geschichten vom pfiffigen Dorle.
