= Ansitz Kreit =

Ansitz in South Tyrol

Coordinates: 46°26′28″N 11°15′57″E

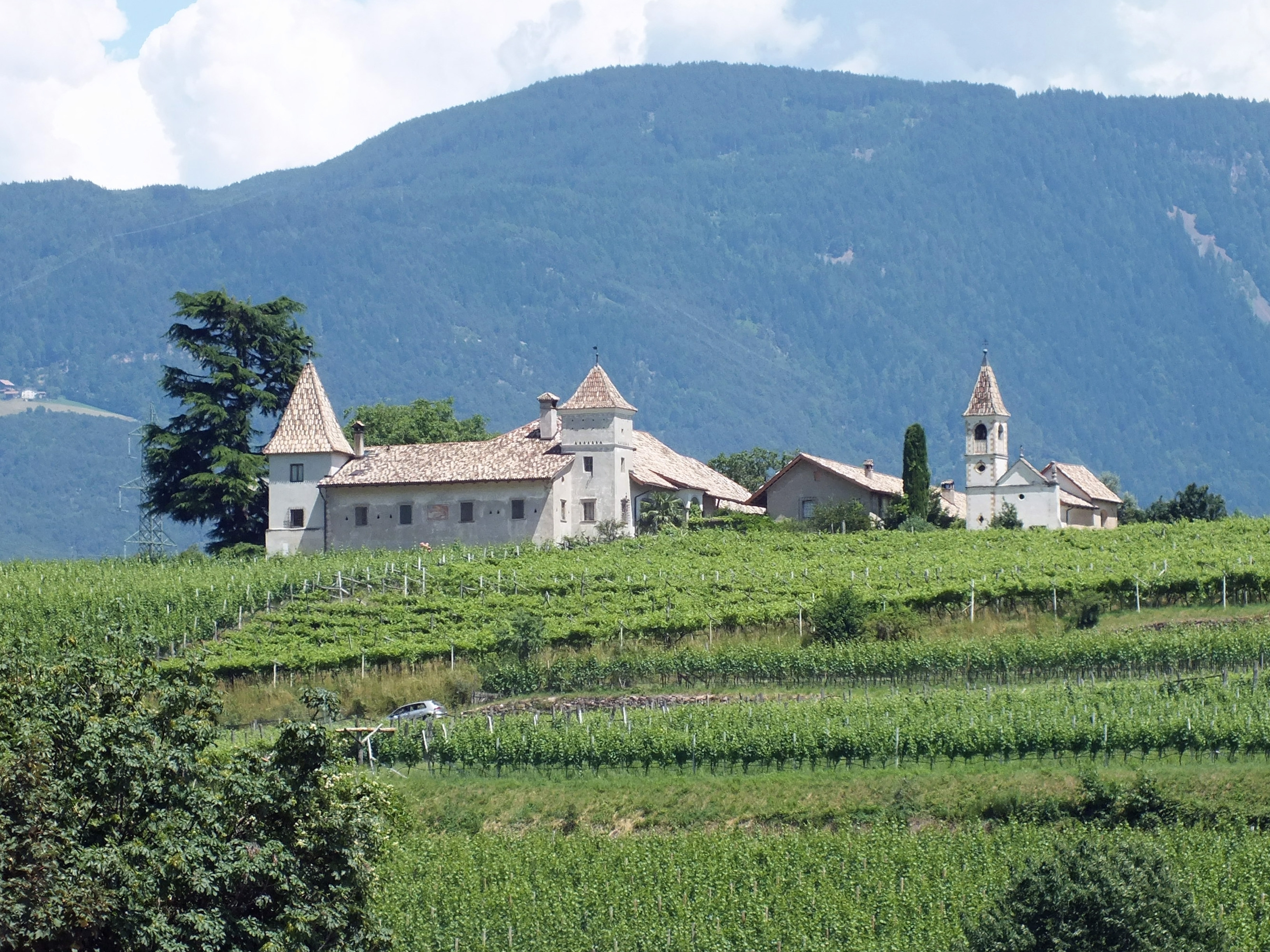
Ansitz Kreit in January 2014

Ansitz Kreit is an Ansitz in Eppan an der Weinstraße, South Tyrol, Italy.

== History ==
Ansitz Kreit is located in the frazione of St. Michael in the municipality of Eppan an der Weinstraße. The main house was built by a farmer named Elias Leys around 1596, converting the farm into an estate. A Catholic chapel, dedicated to Saint Anthony, was built in 1661.

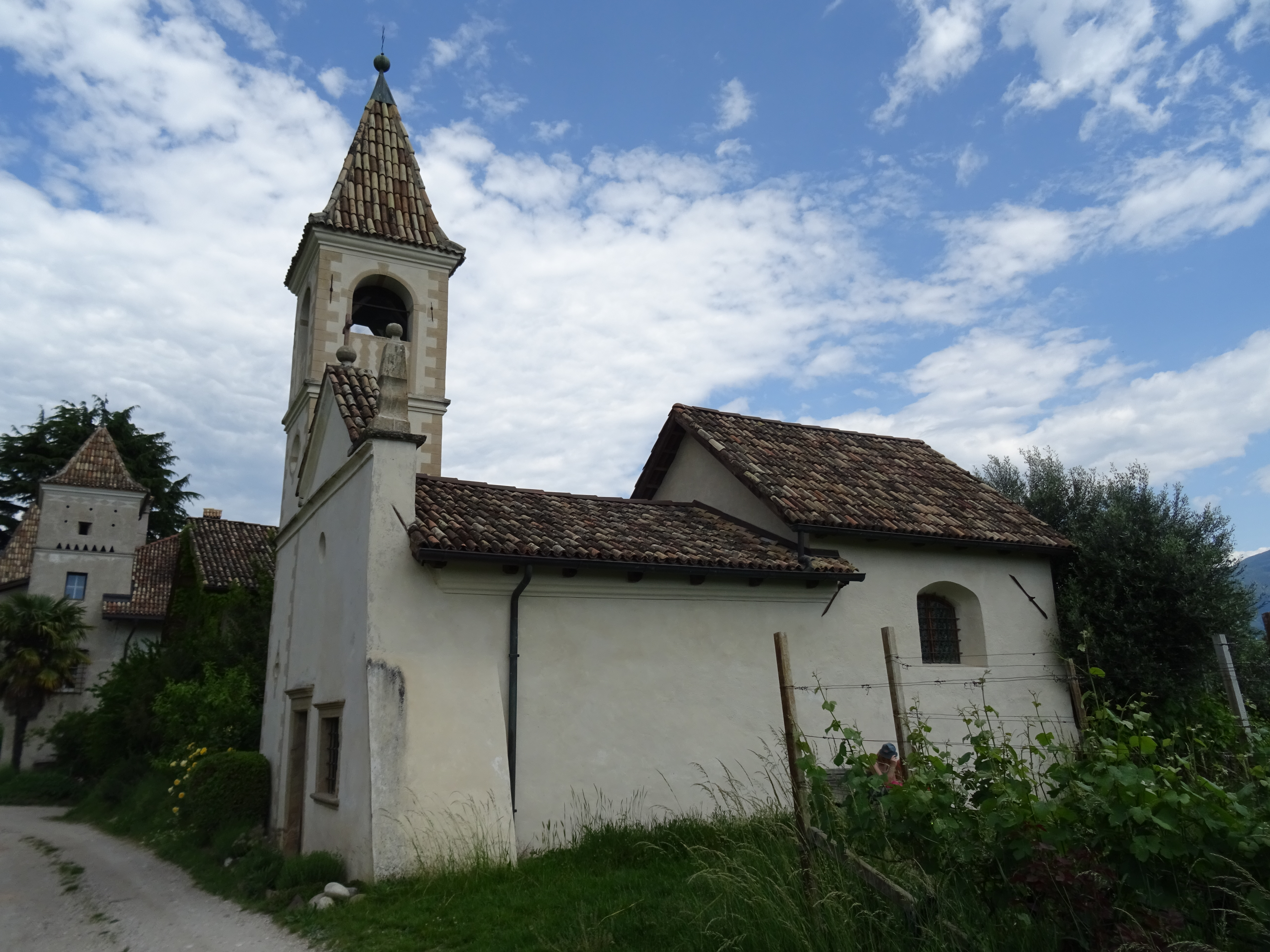
The chapel

Ownership changed to the Zeffer family in the middle of the 17th century. The family was later ennobled, becoming von Zephyris von Greith. The last member of the family to own the estate was a Catholic priest. As he had no heirs, ownership changed after his death. Kreit has been owned by the Raifer family since 1898.

Ansitz Kreit has also been known as Ansitz Straussenhof.
