= Villa Tigelberg =

Mansion in Berneck, Switzerland

- Villa Tigelberg (left) in 1967
- Location: Tigelbergstrasse 3, 9442; Berneck, St. Gallen, Switzerland

History
- Built: 1907

Villa Tigelberg is a mansion in Berneck, St. Gallen, Switzerland. It was build in 1907 for Max Sandherr.

== History ==
In 1907, Max Sandherr relocated his textile company to Berneck and constructed the villa. The house was bequeathed to the local Protestant church in 1938, who ran it as a retirement home. The property was later purchased by Regula Coulin and Marcel Coulin and, in 2006, they founded Tigelberg Berneck, using the villa as a residence for students in upper secondary school and apprenticeships until 2018. Since 2020, the villa has been rented to Sabine Glaser and Adrian Müller, who live there with their foster children.
