= Fürstenhaus Berneck =

House in Berneck, Switzerland

Fürstenhaus
- The Prince's House
- The Fürstenhaus in 2015
- Interactive map of Fürstenhaus
- 47°25′14″N 9°37′14″E
- Type: Tithe barn, residence
- Location: Bahnstrasse 2, 9442; Berneck, St. Gallen, Switzerland

History
- Built: 1729

The Fürstenhaus Berneck (English: Prince's House) is a former tithe barn on the grounds of the Rosenberg Castle ruins in Berneck, Switzerland.

== History ==
The house was built in 1729, on the grounds of Rosenberg Castle, under the direction of Prince Abbot Joseph von Rudolphi as a place to collect the townspeople's tithes to the Abbey of Saint Gall. It remained in this function until the abbey lost its feudal lordship in 1798, during the reign of Prince Abbot Pankraz Vorster. The home then became the property of the Hasler family, who used it as a farmhouse.

Traditionally, the house is opened to the public annually on Saint Martin's Day with flea markets, wine and spirits stands, and fruit stands inside. The house also hosts regional arts festivals.
