= Rosenberg Castle (Berneck) =

Castle ruins in Berneck, Switzerland

- Schloss Rosenberg (German)
- Schlössli Rosenberg in 2015
- Interactive map of Rosenberg Castle
- 47°25′16″N 9°37′05″E
- Location: Berneck, St. Gallen, Switzerland

History
- Built: 13th century

Rosenberg Castle, formerly Bernang Castle, was the seat of the chief bailiffs for the Prince-Abbots of St. Gallen in Berneck, Switzerland. It is protected by the Hague Convention for the Protection of Cultural Property in the Event of Armed Conflict.

== History ==
The castle was built between the 12th and 13th centuries by the Lords of Bernang. The Abbey of Saint Gall acquired the castle in 1290. In 1305, it was acquired by the Lords of Rosenberg.

From 1505 to 1798, the castle served as the seat of the chief bailiff for the Prince Abbot of St. Gall, who served as administrator of the estates between Marbach and Höchst. Jakob Christoph Blarer von Wartensee, the future Bishop of Basel, was born at the castle in 1542.

In 1811, Rosenberg was purchased by nineteen citizens of the town of Berneck, under the direction of Dr. Johann Jakob Ritz, for 34,550 guilders. The castle was demolished in 1812 by the citizens of Berneck, who used the stones as building material.

The remains of the castle, a fortified wall and small garden house known as Schlössli Rosenberg, were purchased by Dr. Julius Custer. His daughters sold the property to Peter Schmid in 2000. At the entrance to the grounds of the former castle stands the Fürstenhaus Berneck, which served as a tithe barn from 1729 to 1798.
