= Rahel Indermaur =

Swiss opera singer

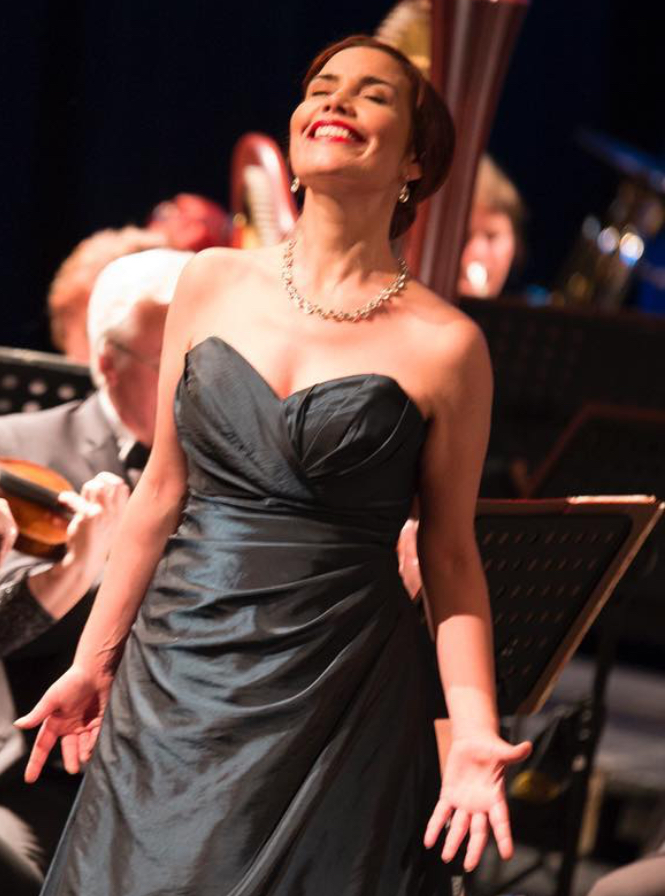
- Indermaur in 2017
- Born: July 19, 1980; Berneck, St. Gallen; Switzerland
- Occupation: opera singer
- Relatives: In der Maur family

Rahel Ava Indermaur (born 19 July 1980) is a Swiss opera singer and dramatic soprano. She was the first recipient of the Cantonal Prize for Culture of the Canton of St. Gallen. Indermaur, trained classically in Germany, has performed throughout Europe and in Asia. Her career includes performances with the Berliner Philharmonie, Tonhalle St. Gallen, Tonhalle Zürich, the Dubrovnik Symphony Orchestra, and the Deutsche Oper Berlin.

== Early life ==
Indermaur was born and raised in Berneck, Switzerland, and is a member of the In der Maur family. After completing primary school, Indermaur moved to Berlin and worked as a teacher at an international school. While working as a teacher, she studied classical singing and vocal performance in Berlin.

== Career ==
Indermaur trained under Grace Bumbry, Marc Tucker, Charlotte Lehmann, David Lee Brewer, and Jean Ronald LaFond. She was awarded the LYRA Music Prize, the Swiss Rotary Club Music Prize, the German Forum New York singing prize, and the Ernst Göhner Prize. Indermaur was the first person to ever have been awarded the Cantonal Prize for Culture of the Canton of St. Gallen.

Indermaur performs as a soprano and dramatic soprano. Her career includes performances in Switzerland, Germany, Spain, and Indonesia. She has performed throughout Europe at the Palau de la Música de València, Chamber Opera Leipzig, the Music Theatre Hamburg, the Sorbian National Theatre, the Konstanz Theater, the Teatro Principal in Palma de Mallorca, the Deutsche Oper Berlin, the Chorin Opera Festival, the Berliner Philharmonie, the Tonhalle St. Gallen, the Tonhalle Zürich, the Berlin Chamber Orchestra, the South West Philharmonic, the Lower Silesian Philharmonic, the Dubrovnik Symphony Orchestra, the Antalya Chamber Orchestra, the Brandenburger Bachist, and the Konstanz Chamber Orchestra. She has also performed at the Aula Simfonia Jakarta in Jakarta, Indonesia.

In 2014 Indermaur released a classical album, Stimmen im salon: romantische gesangsduette, with Nastassja Nass and Kevin McCutcheon, performing works by Felix Mendelssohn.

On 1 May 2016, she performed, alongside soprano Szabina Schnöller, tenor Ricardo Marinello, baritone Äneas Humm, and pianist Kevin McCutcheon at the concert Belle Voci: Highlights From Operas and Operettas, held at the Evangelical Church in Berneck.

On 7 January 2017 Indermaur performed alongside tenor Adam Sanchez at a New Years celebration with the Sorbian National Orchestra and the Sorbian National Ballet.

In December 2019 Indermaur performed as part of Beat Antenen's Swiss Television Christmas special Merry Christmas at the armory in Teufen.

== Discography ==
=== Albums ===
- Stimmen im salon: romantische gesangsduette (2014)
