= Edna Indermaur =

American contralto

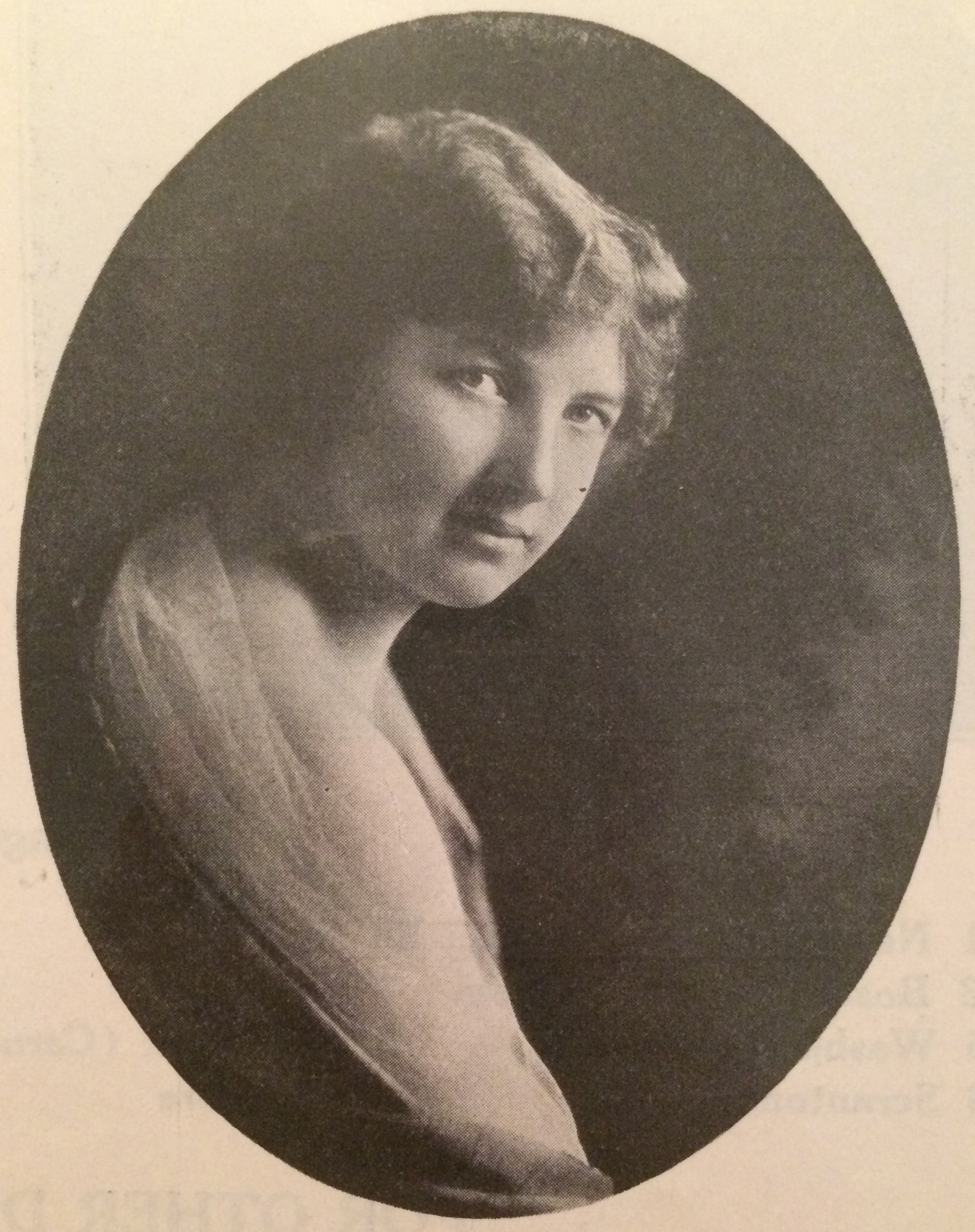
- Indermaur in 1923
- Born: Edna Freda Indermaur; December 21, 1892; Buffalo, New York
- Died: January 10, 1985 (aged 92); Sacramento, California
- Occupation: singer
- Spouse: Ernest Eugene Zirkle
- Children: 1
- Parent(s): Ulrich Indermaur; Fredericka Lang

Edna Freda Indermaur (December 21, 1892 – January 10, 1985) was an American contralto singer. She made her debut at the Aeolian Hall in Manhattan. Throughout her career, Indermaur performed in recitals around New York, at Winthrop University in South Carolina, and with the Minneapolis Symphony Orchestra in Minnesota.

== Biography ==
Indermaur was born on December 21, 1892, in Buffalo, New York to Ulrich Indermaur and Fredericka Lang. Indermaur was of Swiss descent and a member of the In der Maur family.

Indermaur made her musical debut at the Aeolian Hall in New York City in 1922. She performed as a soloist, as a duet performer with Dicie llowvlia, and with the Artone Quartet. Indermaur had a successful career performing in recitals around New York as well as performances at Winthrop University, the Buffalo Festival, and with the Minneapolis Symphony Orchestra.

She married Ernest Eugene Zirkle, a member of the United States Army Hospital Corps, on May 24, 1926 in New York City. They had one daughter. Indermaur died on January 10, 1985, in Sacramento, California.
