= Berneck, St. Gallen =

Berneck
- Municipality
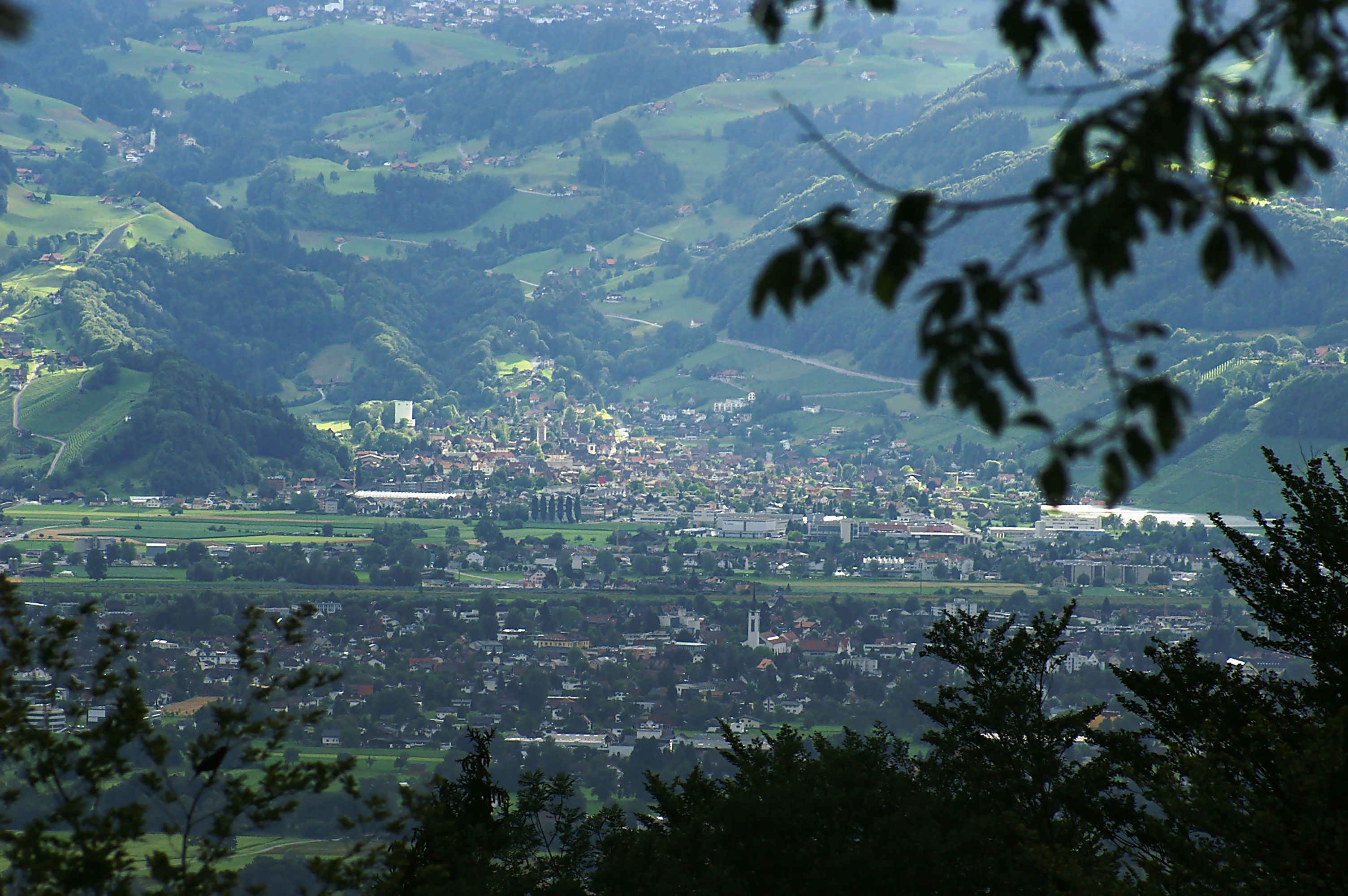

- Coat of arms
- Location of Berneck
- Location within Switzerland Location within Canton of St. Gallen
- Coordinates: 47°26′N 9°37′E
- Country: Switzerland
- Canton: St. Gallen
- District: Rheintal

Government
  - Mayor: Shaleen Mastroberardino

Area
  - Total: 5.629 km^{2} (2.173 sq mi)
- Elevation: 404 m (1,325 ft)

Population (December 2020)
  - Total: 3,928
  - Density: 697.8/km^{2} (1,807/sq mi)
- Time zone: UTC+01:00 (CET)
  - Summer (DST): UTC+02:00 (CEST)
- Postal code: 9442
- SFOS number: 3233
- ISO 3166 code: CH-SG
- Surrounded by: Au, Balgach, Oberegg (AI), Walzenhausen (AR)
- Website: www.berneck.ch

Berneck is a municipality in the Wahlkreis (constituency) of Rheintal in the canton of St. Gallen in Switzerland.

== History ==
Berneck is first mentioned in 892 as Farniwang. In 1210 it was mentioned as Bernanc.

== Coat of arms ==
The blazon of the municipal coat of arms is Or a Vine Vert fructed Azure issuant from base of the second and twined around a stake Gules that is held by a Bear rampant Sable langued armed and in his virility of the third. The presence of a bear (German: Bär and also the root of Bern) is a weak example of canting, where a symbol on the coat of arms forms a visual pun or rebus.

== Geography ==
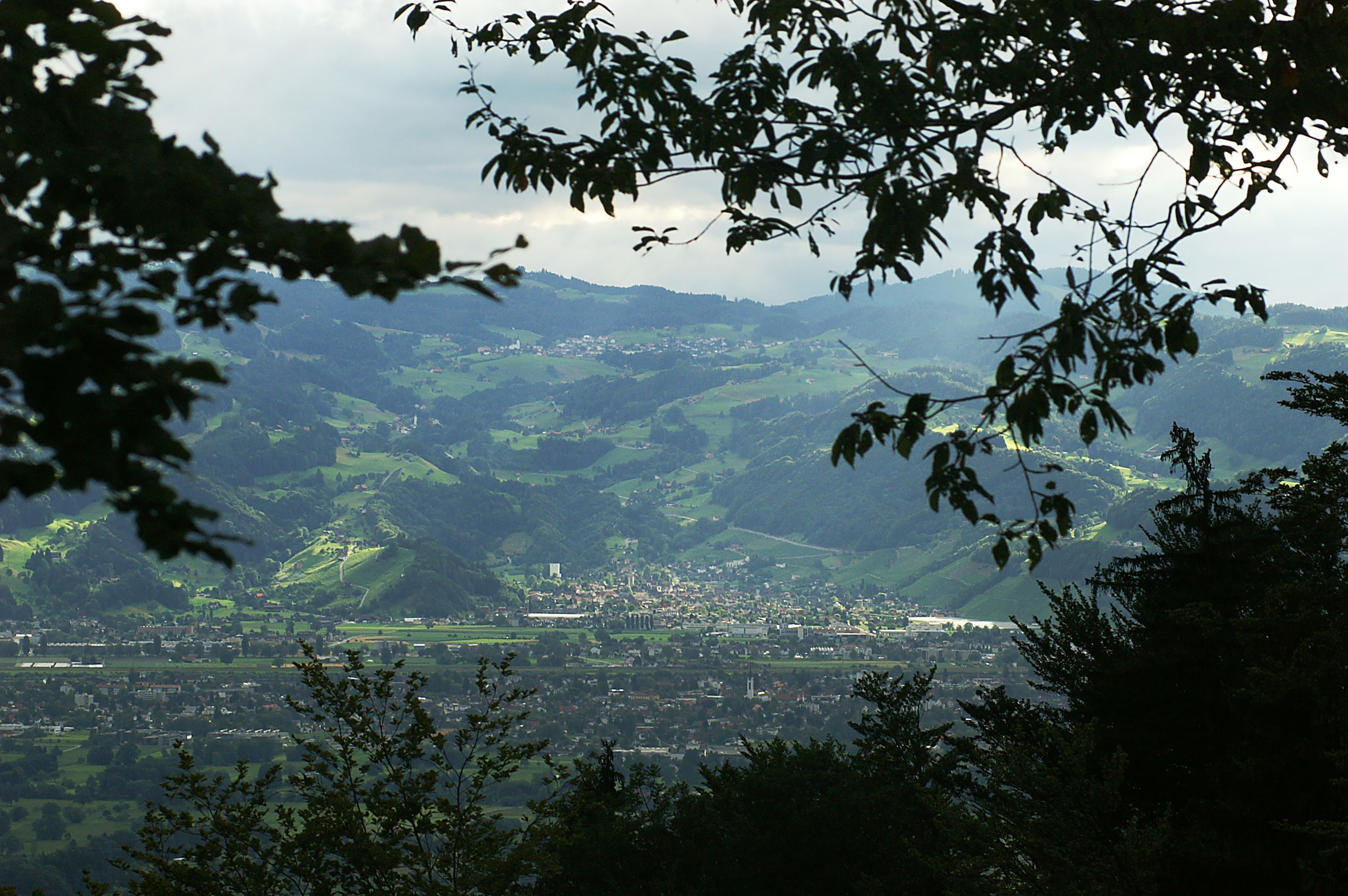
Berneck, as seen from Oberfallenberg in Dornbirn

Aerial view from 600 m by Walter Mittelholzer (1923)

Berneck has an area, as of 2006, of 5.6 km^{2} (2.2 sq mi). Of this area, 49.6% is used for agricultural purposes, while 29.6% is forested. Of the rest of the land, 20.3% is settled (buildings or roads) and the remainder (0.5%) is non-productive (rivers or lakes).

The municipality is located in the former Unterrheintal district of the Rheintal Wahlkreis. It is between a line of hills and a side channel of the Rhine valley. It consists of the village of Berneck and the hamlets of Kobel, Rüden, Taa, Husen, Hinterburg and Buechholz.

== Demographics ==
Berneck has a population (as of 31 December 2020) of 3,928. As of 2007, about 16.8% of the population was made up of foreign nationals. Of the foreign population, (as of 2000), 60 are from Germany, 114 are from Italy, 190 are from ex-Yugoslavia, 72 are from Austria, 15 are from Turkey, and 38 are from another country. Over the last 10 years the population has grown at a rate of 3.7%. Most of the population (as of 2000) speaks German (93.3%), with Italian being second most common ( 1.9%) and Albanian being third ( 1.6%). Of the Swiss national languages (as of 2000), 3,068 speak German, 5 people speak French, 61 people speak Italian, and 1 person speaks Romansh.

The age distribution, as of 2000, in Berneck is; 394 children or 12.0% of the population are between 0 and 9 years old and 505 teenagers or 15.4% are between 10 and 19. Of the adult population, 345 people or 10.5% of the population are between 20 and 29 years old. 529 people or 16.1% are between 30 and 39, 498 people or 15.1% are between 40 and 49, and 395 people or 12.0% are between 50 and 59. The senior population distribution is 295 people or 9.0% of the population are between 60 and 69 years old, 182 people or 5.5% are between 70 and 79, there are 122 people or 3.7% who are between 80 and 89, and there are 24 people or 0.7% who are between 90 and 99.

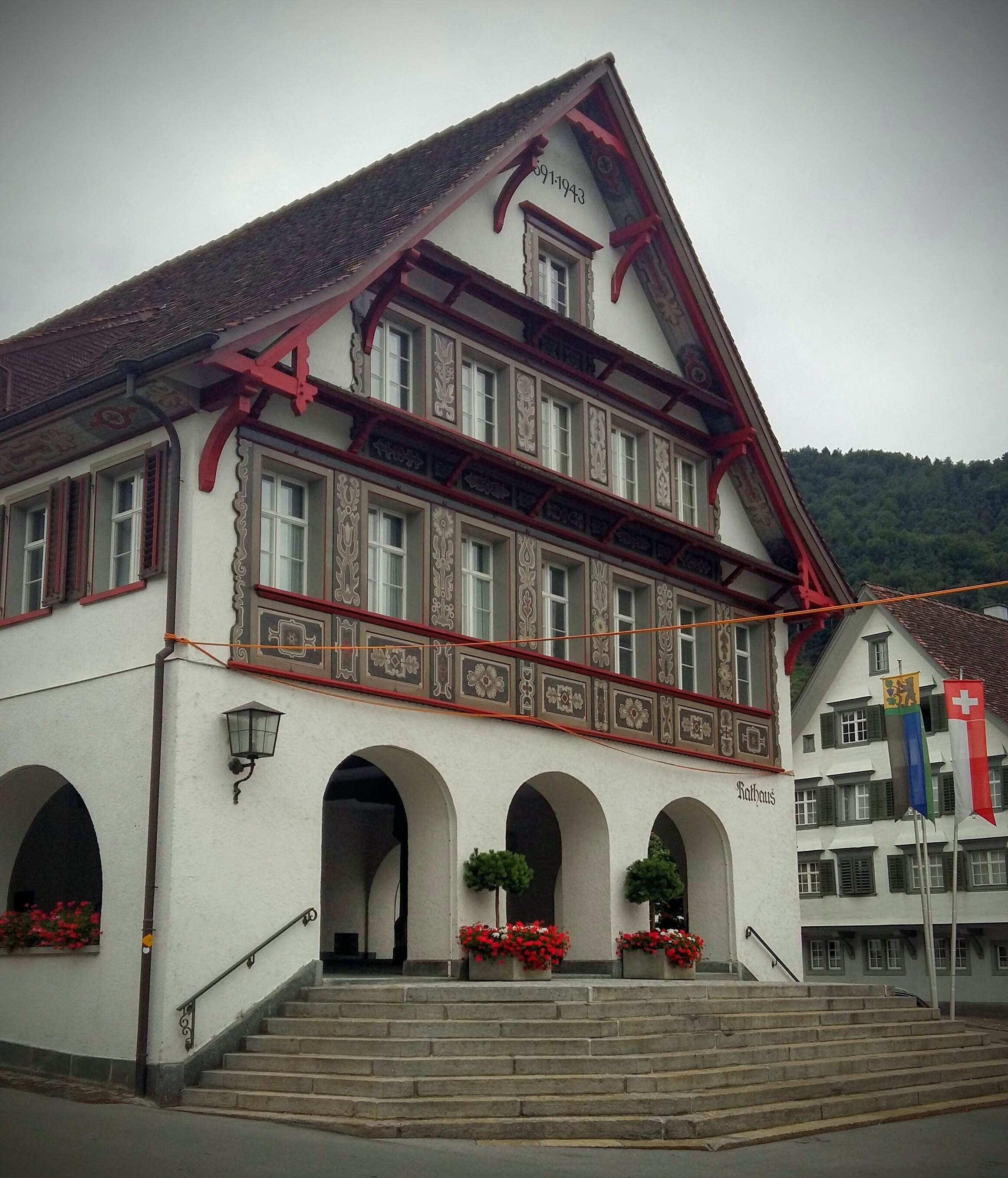
Berneck town hall

In 2000 there were 383 persons (or 11.6% of the population) who were living alone in a private dwelling. There were 729 (or 22.2%) persons who were part of a couple (married or otherwise committed) without children, and 1,836 (or 55.8%) who were part of a couple with children. There were 207 (or 6.3%) people who lived in single parent home, while there are 34 persons who were adult children living with one or both parents, 12 persons who lived in a household made up of relatives, 22 who lived household made up of unrelated persons, and 66 who are either institutionalized or live in another type of collective housing.

In the 2007 federal election the most popular party was the SVP which received 30.5% of the vote. The next three most popular parties were the CVP (23.3%), the FDP (21%) and the SP (12.2%).

The entire Swiss population is generally well educated. In Berneck about 76.1% of the population (between age 25-64) have completed either non-mandatory upper secondary education or additional higher education (either university or a Fachhochschule). Out of the total population in Berneck, as of 2000, the highest education level completed by 692 people (21.0% of the population) was Primary, while 1,269 (38.6%) have completed Secondary, 386 (11.7%) have attended a Tertiary school, and 106 (3.2%) are not in school. The remainder did not answer this question.

The historical population is given in the following table:

year	population
1837	2,564
1850	2,044
1900	2,250
1930	2,096
1950	2,390
2000	3,289

== Economy ==
As of 2007, Berneck had an unemployment rate of 1.64%. As of 2005, there were 109 people employed in the primary economic sector and about 40 businesses involved in this sector. 725 people are employed in the secondary sector and there are 55 businesses in this sector. 782 people are employed in the tertiary sector, with 114 businesses in this sector.

As of October 2009 the average unemployment rate was 3.4%. There were 228 businesses in the municipality of which 58 were involved in the secondary sector of the economy while 135 were involved in the third.

As of 2000 there were 623 residents who worked in the municipality, while 1,061 residents worked outside Berneck and 1,118 people commuted into the municipality for work. Viniculture is a popular industry in the region, and the Maienhalde vineyard is located in Berneck.

== Religion ==
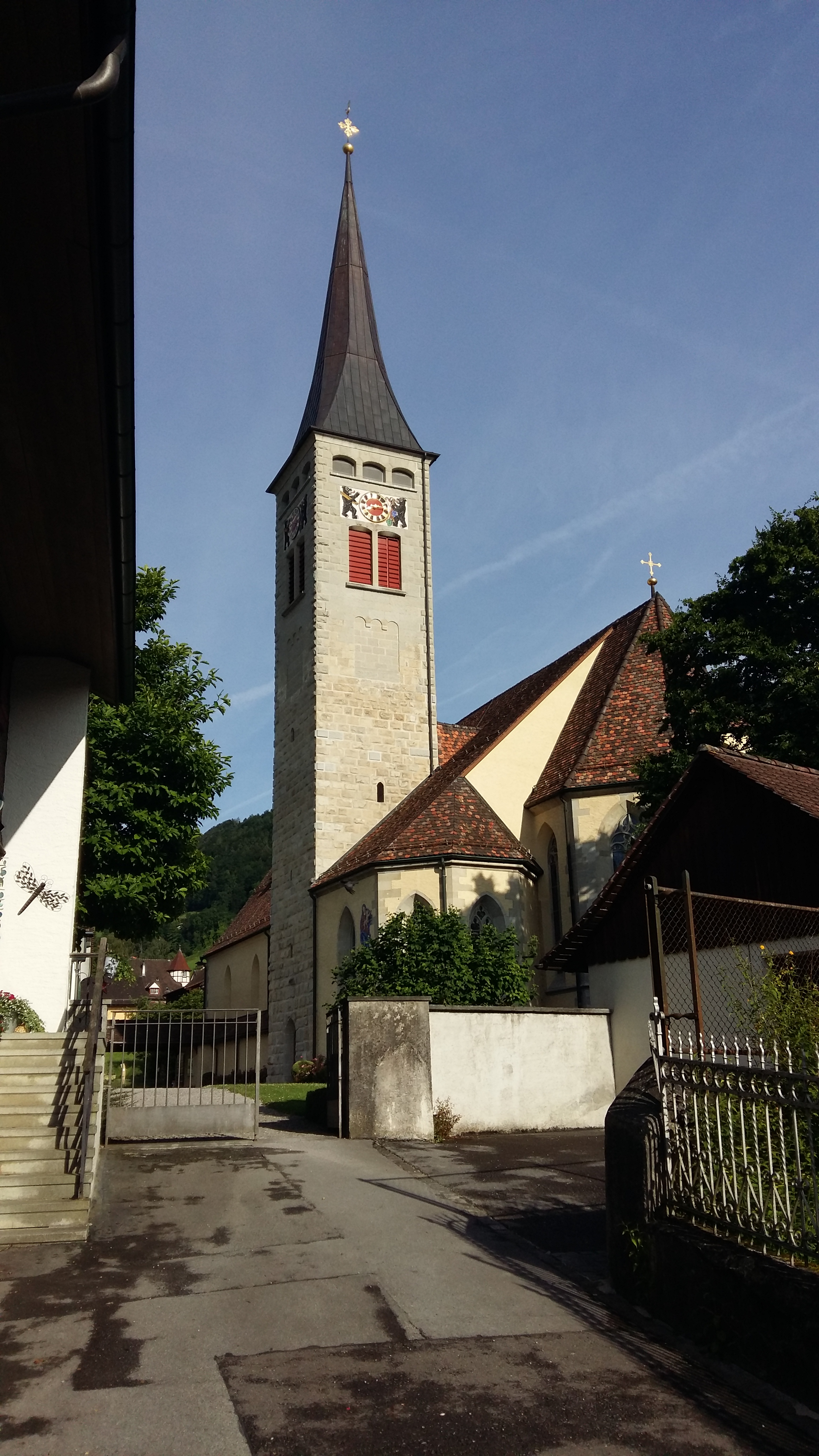
The Catholic parish church in Berneck

From the 2000 census, 1,627 or 49.5% are Roman Catholic, while 1,109 or 33.7% belonged to the Swiss Reformed Church. Of the rest of the population, there are 25 individuals (or about 0.76% of the population) who belong to the Orthodox Church, and there are 103 individuals (or about 3.13% of the population) who belong to another Christian church. There are 155 (or about 4.71% of the population) who are Islamic. There are 7 individuals (or about 0.21% of the population) who belong to another church (not listed on the census), 189 (or about 5.75% of the population) belong to no church, are agnostic or atheist, and 74 individuals (or about 2.25% of the population) did not answer the question.

== Sights ==
There are three regions which are designated as part of the Inventory of Swiss Heritage Sites. The first is the urbanized village of Berneck. The second is the Schlosslandschaft Ober/Unterrheintal, a concentration of castles that spans Altstätten, Balgach, Berneck and Marbach. While the third is the shared, urbanized village of Balgach/Herrbrugg, which is shared between Au (SG), Balgach and Berneck. Notable historic buildings in Berneck include Rathaus Berneck, the Rosenberg Castle ruins, the Fürstenhaus, Schlössli Buchholz, and Villa Tigelberg.

== Notable citizens and residents ==
- Johannes Dierauer, historian and librarian
- Sarah Forster, ice hockey player
- Rahel Indermaur, opera singer
- Jakob Christoph Blarer von Wartensee, nobleman and Catholic bishop

=== Citizens born outside of Berneck ===
- Mike Egger, politician
- Heinrich Federer, Catholic priest (whose father Johann Paul Federer was from Berneck)
- Roger Federer, tennis player (whose father Robert Federer is from Berneck)

=== Notable families ===
- Federer family
- In der Maur
