= Rathaus Berneck =

Government building in Berneck, Switzerland

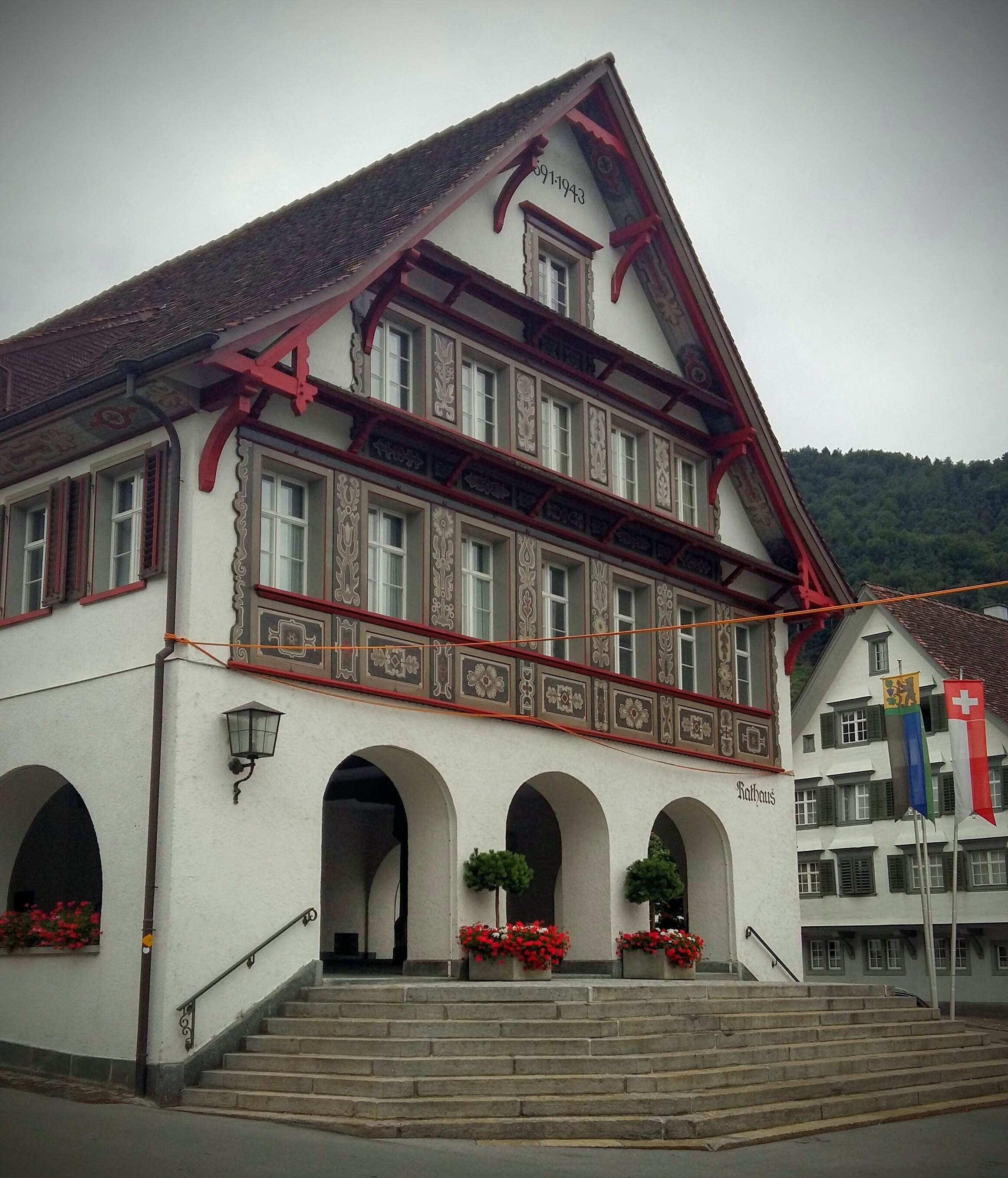
- Rathaus Berneck in 2015
- Interactive map of Rathaus Berneck
- 47°25′30″N 9°36′32″E
- Location: Rathausplatz 1, 9442; Berneck, St. Gallen, Switzerland

History
- Built: 1591

The Rathaus Berneck is the municipal government building in Berneck, St. Gallen, Switzerland. It was built in 1591 and serves as a town hall, local court, market hall, and civic tavern.

== History ==
In 1500, the Bernang estate (present day Berneck) was granted market rights, a privilege usually reserved for urban settlements, by the Prince Abbot Gotthard Giel von Glattburg of the Abbey of Saint Gall, which allowed weekly markets to take place. A covered market hall was built in 1501, known as the "Gmeindshus".

In 1591, Prince Abbot Joachim Opser had the market hall demolished and the town hall constructed in its place. The building served as a council chamber, court, market hall, and civic tavern. The building sits at the foot of the Taa rock ridge along the upper end of Neugass. The exterior of the building features murals and two memorial plaques.

In 1798, citizens from across the Rheintal assembled at the town hall for a Landsgemeinde, where they voted to petition the ruling Swiss cantons to relinquish their sovereign rights over them in order to form the Republic of the Rhine Valley. The new republic was short-lived, as the invading French forces soon after established the Helvetic Republic. The town became part of the newly created Canton of Säntis and, in 1803, it became part of the newly created Canton of St. Gallen. Under the new cantonal structure, a municipal council was appointed and school and church systems were reorganized.

In 1848, the building survived a village fire. In 1943, it underwent extensive renovations. It was renovated again between 2025 and 2026. In 2026, Aurel Notz, a local high school student, made the news after constructing a replica of the town hall out of 5,130 Lego bricks.
