= Scott Indermaur =

American photographer and producer

Scott Indermaur is an American photographer and multimedia producer. He worked as a photojournalist and sports photographer before switching to commercial and corporate photography.

== Career ==
Early on in his career, Indermaur worked as a photojournalist with the Associated Press, Kansas City Star, The Arizona Republic, and The New York Times. While working as a photojournalist, he also photographed Major League Soccer games for Sports Illustrated. As a commercial and corporate photographer, Indermaur has worked with IBM, J. C. Penney, General Motors, Land Rover, the Rhode Island School of Design, Sprint, Ryder, Pratt & Whitney, and Black & Decker. He has also shot official portraits of Kathleen Sebelius, Ben Bernanke, and Alan Greenspan.

In 2005 Indermaur started REVEALED, an artistic project made up of portraits and interviews. In 2011 he included a spin-off project focusing on elementary school-aged children. In 2012 Indermaur published a photography book titled REVEALED: Personal Visions of Transformation and Discovery, based on the project. Subjects of REVEALED were featured in a documentary by Christian de Rezendes called REVEALED:Portraits from Beneath One's Surface.

Indermaur founded Indermaur Media, a broadcasting and multimedia production company.

== Personal life ==
Indermaur lives in East Greenwich, Rhode Island. He is a member of the In der Maur family.
