= Maienhalde =

Vineyard in Berneck, Switzerland

- Native name: Weingut Maienhalde
- Industry: Winery
- Headquarters: Obereggerstrasse 1028 9442, Berneck, St. Gallen, Switzerland
- Owner: Indermaur family
- Website: maienhalde.ch

The Maienhalde is a vineyard and winery in Berneck, St. Gallen, Switzerland. It has been owned by the Indermaur family for four generations.

== History ==
The Maienhalde is a vineyard, winery, and restaurant in Berneck, St. Gallen. The valley region is popular for cultivating Swiss wine. The estate sits on a hill overlooking the St. Gallen Rhine Valley and the village of Berneck.

The vineyard has been owned by the Indermaur family for four generations. In the 21st century, the vineyard and winery are run by Peter Indermaur. Kurt Indermaur is the head chef of the Restaurant Maienhalde.

In 2015, club president Hanspeter Hauser opened the 58th general meeting of the Berneck Shooting Club at the Maienhalde. Later that year, the FDP The Liberals of Berneck gathered at the Mainehalde for their general meeting to elect a new party president.

In 2016, the vineyard served as the location for the planning meeting for the town's participation in the St. Gallen Festival.

In 2018, the vineyard hosted the annual general meeting of the Association of Former Upper Secondary School Students of Berneck and Mittelrheintal.
