= Kager =

Kager is a surname. Notable people with the surname include:

- Bernd Kager (born 1987), Austrian footballer
- Johann Matthias Kager (1566–1634), German painter
- Reinhard Kager (born 1954), Austrian philosopher, journalist, and music promoter
- René Kager (born 1957), Dutch linguist
