= Ivo Meinhold-Heerlein =

German gynaecologist

Ivo Meinhold-Heerlein (born 23 March 1969 in Mainz) is a German gynaecologist and obstetrician, honorary professor, university professor and deputy director of the Department of Gynaecology and Obstetrics at the University Hospital RWTH Aachen University. He is known for his work in the fields of molecular characterization of ovarian cancer.

== Biography ==
Meinhold-Heerlein studied medicine at the Medical University of Lübeck and at the University of Freiburg from 1989 to 1996. In 1996 he finished his doctoral thesis entitled "Implementing the technique of a non-radioactive in situ hybridization of normal tissues using the example of human skin" ("Etablierung der Technik einer nicht-radioaktiven In-situ-Hybridisierung in Normalgewebe am Beispiel der menschlichen Haut"). From 1999 to 2001 he worked as postdoctoral researcher at the Burnham Institute / La Jolla Cancer Research Center, San Diego, USA. He obtained his license in gynaecology and obstetrics in 2006. In 2007 Meinhold-Heerlein was habilitated at the University of Kiel. From 2006 to 2008 he served as the acting head of the Kiel School of Gynaecological Endoscopy. In 2009 Meinhold-Heerlein became deputy director of the Department of Gynaecology and Obstetrics at the University Hospital Aachen. In the same year he obtained his license in "Special Obstetrics and Perinatal Medicine". In 2012 he was appointed as extraordinary professor (e.g. associate professor) on the medical faculty of the RWTH Aachen University. In 2013 he obtained his license in "Gynaecologic Oncology". Meinhold-Heerlein was appointed as honorary associate professor of the University of Cape Town (South Africa) in 2014. He is currently deputy director of the Department of Gynaecology and Obstetrics at the University Hospital RWTH Aachen as well as head of the gynaecological cancer centre and the endometriosis centre of the University Hospital RWTH Aachen. In 2017 he was appointed as university professor (full professor) for gynaecologic oncology at the RWTH Aachen University.

== Scientific contribution ==
At the beginning of his scientific career Meinhold-Heerlein worked with John C. Reed at The Burnham Institute (La Jolla / USA), where he investigated mechanisms to induce aptoptosis and to overcome chemotherapy resistance of ovarian cancer. Those studies evaluated two key signaling pathways – the death receptor as well as the mitochondrial pathway.

Since the cell cycle regulator p53 is known to transactivate both pathways, several studies focused on p53 mutation and expression analyses. Meinhold-Heerlein and coworkers showed that poorly differentiated ovarian cancer harbors p53 mutations to a higher extent than hitherto assumed.

Together with Garret Hampton, Meinhold-Heerlein performed oligonucleotide array analyses and identified novel molecular markers suitable as therapeutic targets. The main focus lay on the evaluation of serous tumors, which represent the majority of ovarian cancer cases. An important finding was that non-invasive tumors of low-malignant potential (so-called borderline tumors) showed a nearly identical expression pattern when compared to highly differentiated invasive carcinomas. Moderate and poorly differentiated carcinomas, by contrast, shared a nearly identical expression pattern with respect to one another but which was significantly different from the former pattern. With these findings Meinhold-Heerlein contributed to the contemporary understanding of serous ovarian cancer in discriminating two significant types: low grade versus high grade.

After returning to Germany, Meinhold-Heerlein continued his research at the University of Kiel with funding from the Deutsche Krebshilfe (German Cancer Aid). Together with Dirk Bauerschlag and Garret Hampton, he identified additional markers suitable as serum markers for early detection of ovarian cancer subgroups.

Currently, in collaboration with Ahmad Hussain and Stefan Barth, he focuses on immunological approaches called theranostics to detect and eliminate ovarian cancer as well as endometriosis. This type of approach involves linking specific antibodies to molecules which help detect and/or eliminate disease-specific cells.

== Academic memberships ==
- Organ commission Ovary of the Arbeitsgemeinschaft Gynäkologische Onkologie (AGO)
- Commission Translational Research of the Arbeitsgemeinschaft Gynäkologische Onkologie (AGO)
- Scientific advisory board of the foundation Endometriosis Research
- Editorial Board BioMedRes International
- Associate Editor Archives Gynecology and Obstetrics
- Section Editor Current Obstetrics and Gynecology Reports
- Scientific advisory board of the Endometriosis Research Foundation

== Honors and awards ==
- 2003: Staude-Pfannenstiel Award of the Norddeutsche Gesellschaft für Gynäkologie und Geburtshilfe
- 2004: Scientific Award of the Norddeutsche Gesellschaft für Gynäkologie und Geburtshilfe
- 2004: First Award of the Deutsche Gesellschaft für Gynäkologie und Geburtshilfe
- 2006: GebFra-Preis of the Deutsche Gesellschaft für Gynäkologie und Geburtshilfe
- 2008: Hans-Frangenheim Award of the Arbeitsgemeinschaft Gynäkologische Endoskopie (AGE)
- 2010: Dr. Rockstroh Award of the Deutsche Gesellschaft für Gynäkologie und Geburtshilfe

== Publications ==
- PubMed Publikationsliste: Meinhold-Heerlein
