= Bernhard Müller (abbot) =

Abbot of Saint Gall

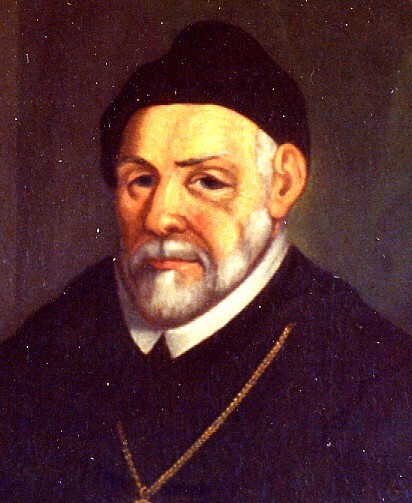
Bernhard Müller

Bernhard Müller (born 1557 in Ochsenhausen; died 18 December 1630 in Rorschach) was prince-abbot of the Abbey of Saint Gall from 1594 until 1630. He was the son of Brosi Müller and Magdalena Lutz.

== Life ==
Bernhard Müller attended the Grammar School of Ochsenhausen Abbey from the age of eight until he was 15. He came to St. Gallen in 1574 and took his vows on 17 December 1576. He studied syntax, humanities, rhetoric, and philosophy from 1577 until 1583. On 19 April 1582 he became baccalaureus philosophiae, on 18 June 1583 he became licentiatus and on 21 June of the same year he became magister artium liberalium summa cum laude. He authored a number of Latin poems. From 1583 he was subdeacon in Saint Gall and became deacon and priest in 1584. Four years later, on 5 May 1588, he became baccalaureus theologiae in Dillingen. He became licentiatus theologiae on 11 December 1589 and finally – after public disputation – doctor theologiae on 26 October 1593. This allowed him to preach in St. Gallen and neighbouring parishes, which he frequently did. He was elected abbot of Saint Gall on 27 August 1594. Pope Clement VIII confirmed him on 12 December 1594 in Rome. There were several complications with the Curia. He received the papal blessing on 16 October 1595 (Clement VIII wrote a papal breve on 18 March 1595 against electoral capitulations which were settled at Bernhard's election). In April 1595, Müller received the obeisance of his subordinates. On 14 June 1595, Emperor Rudolf II confirmed the jura regalia.

On 13 April 1630, he abdicated his abbacy for reasons connected with his health.

== Works ==
Shortly after his appointment as abbot, the nuncio Portia announced a visitation, which would be held in conjunction with Abbot Georg von Weingarten from 25 January until 13 February 1595. The resulting visitation protocol was fundamental for Bernhard's reform policies in the monastery. He also instituted reforms in other monasteries such as Fulda and Engelberg by sending conventual friars from the Abbey of Saint Gall as administrators.

In 1602, Müller founded the Swiss Congregation of the Benedictine Confederation with his colleagues from Einsiedeln, Muri, and Fischingen. In the same year, Saint Gall began to challenge Konstanz for the ecclesiastical jurisdiction over the Saint Gall territory. The Roman Rota ruled in favour of Saint Gall on 1 March 1613.

In 1613 the office of a judicial vicar was established in Saint Gall in a concordat with Konstanz. At the same time, parishes within the abbey's region were removed from the ecclesiastical jurisdiction of the bishop of Konstanz. P. Jodok Metzler became the first judicial vicar of the Princely Abbey of Saint Gall on 22 August 1614. During his abbacy, Müller made regular visitations to the parishes, the first in 1603 and then in 1612/13, 1615, 1618, 1621/22, and 1627.

During Bernhard's tenure, the economic position of the abbey improved and enabled the acquisition of several properties. He wished to repurchase castle Neu-Ravensburg from the city of Wangen. They had bought the castle in 1586, when the abbey was struggling economically. Bernhard argued that because the purchase price was too low, the sale was void. The Reichskammergericht in Speyer ruled in his favour and he was able to buy back the property for 22'000 gulden.

In 1609, Bernhard planned the acquisition of the County of Vaduz and the Lordship of Schellenberg. While these plans never came to fruition, he did purchase several important properties: Homburg and Staringen in 1613, Ebringen in 1621.

In 1610, Bernhard introduced the canvas industry in Rorschach. For that purpose he summoned Balthasar Hofmann from Konstanz to Rorschach and established the necessary facilities. He also conducted several church construction projects; for example, St. Johann abbey, which burnt down in 1626, had to be rebuilt. Other projects commissioned by Müller included the construction of the Otmarskirche, which was consecrated in 1628, as well as the renovation of three different castles.

Müller also formed alliances and signed treaties with the European Powers.
