= Ansitz =

Type of stately home in the Germanic region

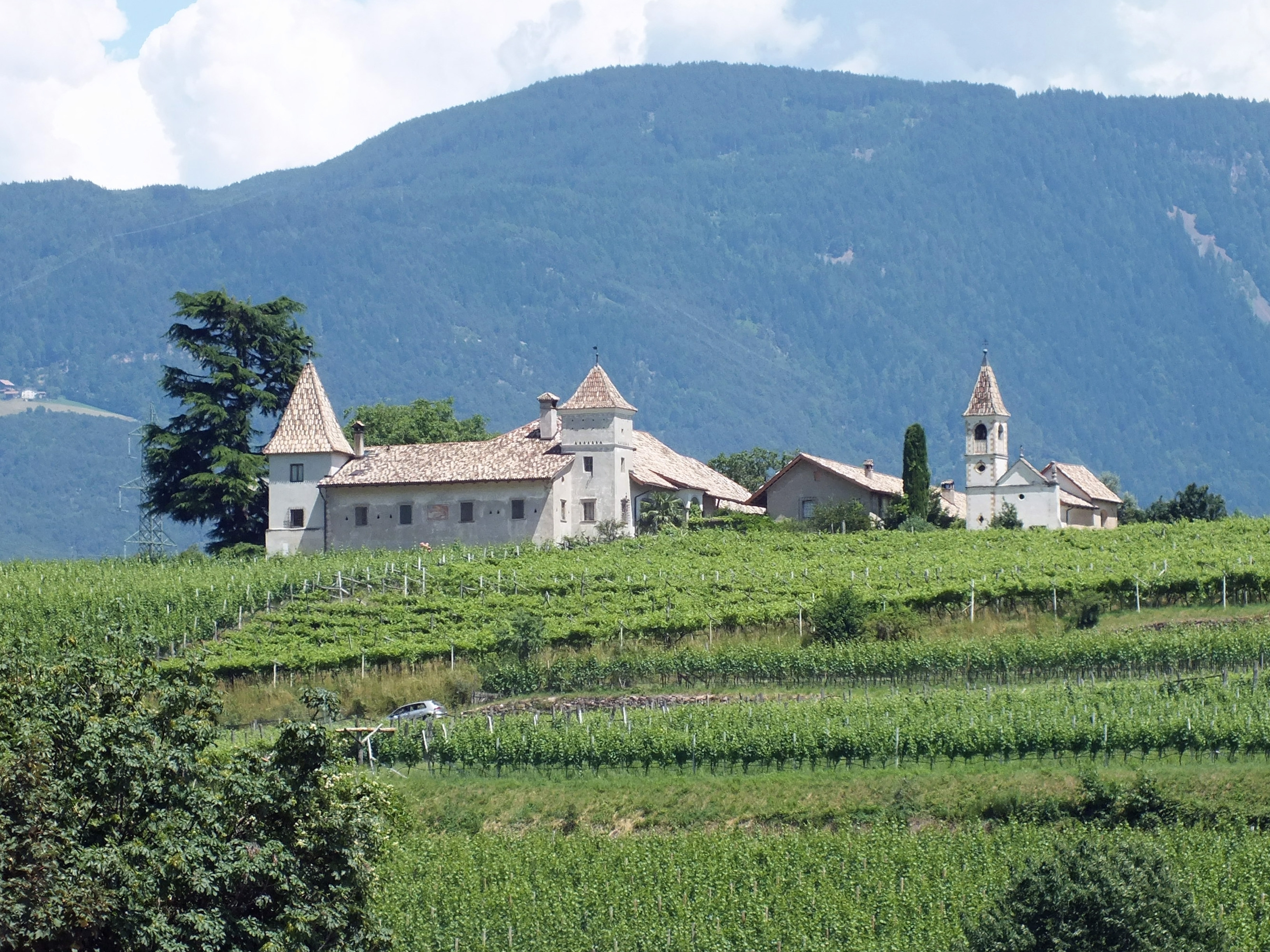
The "Ansitz Kreit" in Eppan, South Tyrol

An Ansitz is a small residence designed for the lower nobility of the Germanic Alpine region.

== History ==
The concept of Ansitz dates back to the end of the Middle Ages up to the 19th century. Unlike castles, they were hardly fortified. They arose when medieval fortifications had lost their military purpose. Residences were designed mainly for the comfortable and prestigious living of their owners. An Ansitz was often extremely ornate in design and furnished to denote the status of its owner.

The application of the word Ansitz to refer to a noble residence is hardly used today outside South Tyrol, Bavaria, and Austria. As of 2008, there are 200 Ansitze remaining in Austria.
