= Federer (surname) =

Federer is a Swiss surname. According to Sandi Toksvig on the "quills" episode of QI, "Federer" means (in Swiss German) one who works with or trades in quills, which are traditionally made from feathers.

Federer may refer to:

- The Federer family of Berneck, St. Gallen
- Barbara Schmid-Federer (born 1965), Swiss politician
- Edi Federer (1955–2012), Austrian ski jumper
- Herbert Federer (1920–2010), American mathematician
- Heinrich Federer (1866–1928), Swiss writer and Catholic priest
- Michelle Federer (born 1973), American theatre and film actress
- Mirka Federer (born 1978), former WTA tennis player and wife of Roger Federer
- Oskar Federer (1884–1968), Czech industrialist
- Roger Federer (born 1981), Swiss tennis player
- Urban Federer (born 1968), Swiss Roman Catholic abbot
- Walter T. Federer (1915-2008), American statistician
