= Federer (disambiguation) =

Roger Federer (born 1981) is a Swiss former professional tennis player.

Federer may also refer to:

- Federer (surname)
- Federer family, a Swiss family
- 4726 Federer, a main-belt asteroid
