= Urban Federer =

Swiss Catholic prelate (born 1968)

Monsignor Urban Federer OSB, OESSH
- 59th Abbot of Einsiedeln Abbey & Fahr Convent
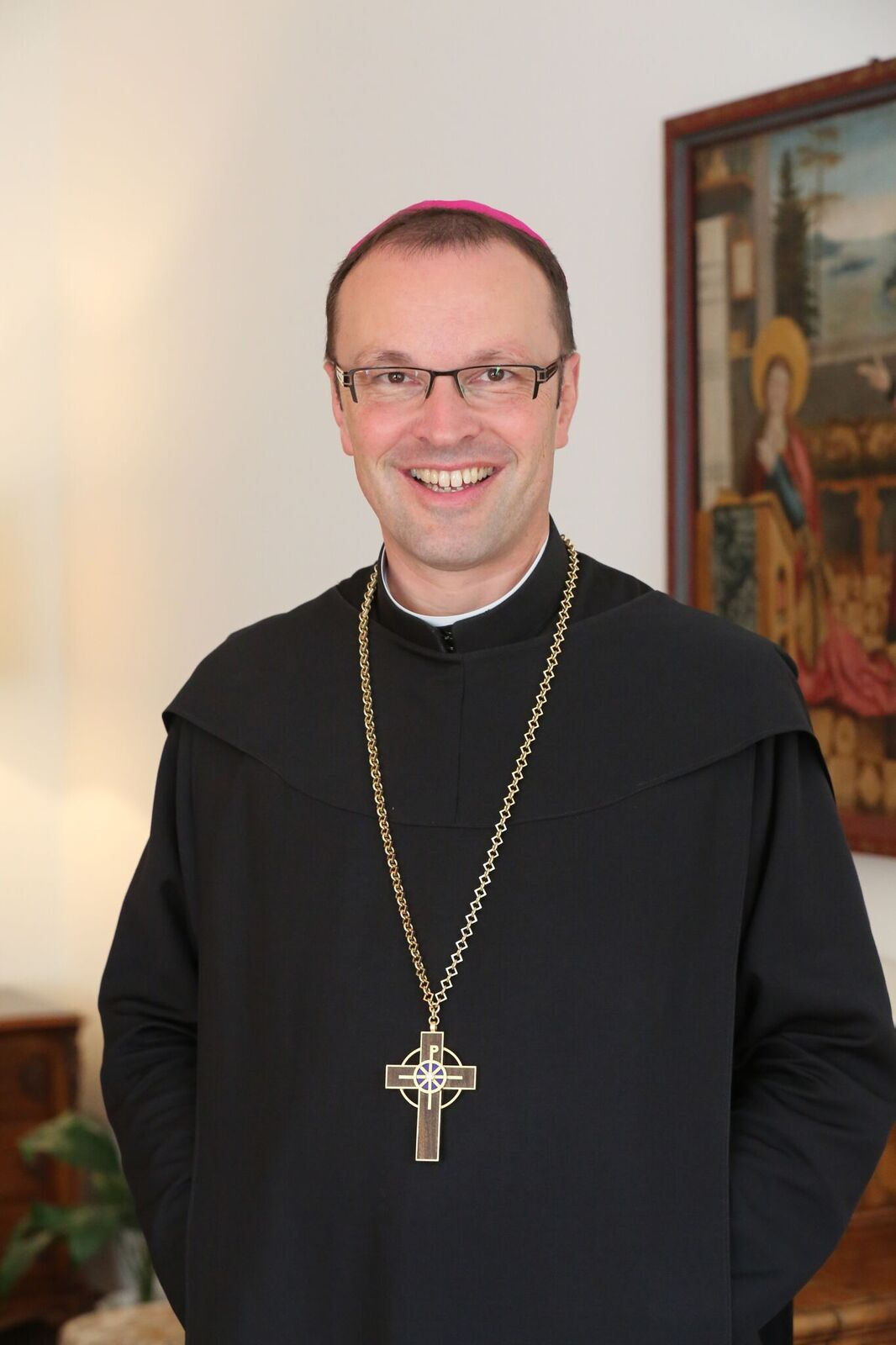
- Federer in 2016
- Elected: 23 November 2013

Orders
- Ordination: 11 June 1994

Personal details
- Born: 17 August 1968 (age 58) Zürich, Canton of Zürich, Switzerland
- Denomination: Catholic Church
- Residence: Einsiedeln Abbey
- Education: Einsiedeln Abbey Theological Home School; Saint Meinrad Seminary and School of Theology; University of Fribourg
- Motto: Adiutor in Christo
- Coat of arms

Urban Federer OSB OESSH (born 17 August 1968) is a Swiss Benedictine prelate who has served as the abbot of Einsiedeln Abbey and Fahr Convent since 2013. Federer was formerly the prior and vicar general of Einsiedeln Abbey and the editor-in-chief of Salve, the abbey's official magazine. In 2017, he was made a Knight of the Pontifical Equestrian Order of the Holy Sepulcher of Jerusalem.

== Early life and family ==
Born in Zurich on 17 August 1968, Urban Federer is a member of the Federer family, who are part of the Bürgergemeinde of Berneck, St. Gallen, and is the brother of the Swiss politician Barbara Schmid-Federer.

Urban Federer is the great-great-grandson of the 19th-20th century politician Josef Zemp, who was the first member of a conservative party to be elected to the Federal Council of Switzerland. The prelate is also related to Ida Glanzmann-Hunkeler, a politician; Heinrich Federer, a Catholic priest; and Roger Federer, a former world №1 tennis player and grand slam champion, whose children he baptized.

== Ecclesiastical career ==
Urban Federer attended the Einsiedeln Convent School and Saint Meinrad Seminary and School of Theology from 1985 to 1988 before joining the Order of Saint Benedict and beginning his novitiate at Einsiedeln Abbey. He made his final vows on 1 November 1992 and received the sacrament of holy orders on 11 June 1994. He studied philosophy and theology at the abbey's theological home school and completed a licentiate degree in German studies and history at the University of Fribourg. He also completed Gregorian chant training in Germany.

In 2001, Federer worked as a religion, German language, and history teacher at the abbey's grammar school. In 2007 he received his doctorate with a dissertation in medieval German studies on mystical experience in literary dialogue between Heinrich von Nördlingen and Margaretha Ebner in the 14th century.

In 2010, Federer was appointed as Prior and Vicar General of Einsiedeln Abbey. He was made editor-in-chief of the abbey's magazine, Salve, and a board member of the Einsiedler Welttheater-Gesellschaft. He is also a cantor and the choral master. He was elected as abbot on 23 November 2013 by fifty-five voting monks. Pope Francis confirmed his election on 10 December 2013. His inauguration took place on 22 December 2013, performed by Bishop Markus Büchel. As abbot, he is also a member of the Swiss Bishops' Conference and has jurisdiction over Fahr Convent.

In 2017, Federer was appointed as a Knight of the Pontifical Equestrian Order of the Holy Sepulcher of Jerusalem by Cardinal Edwin Frederick O'Brien and was invested into the order on 18 March 2017 at Abbey of Saint-Maurice d'Agaune by Bishop Pier Giacomo Grampa.
