= Meinrad of Einsiedeln =

German Benedictine hermit (c.797–861)

Saint Meinrad of Einsiedeln
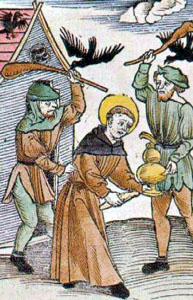

Saint
- Born: c. 797
- Died: 21 January 861; Einsiedeln
- Venerated in: Orthodox Church; Roman Catholic Church
- Feast: 21 January
- Attributes: two ravens
- Patronage: Hospitality

Meinrad (Latin: Meinradus, Mainradus; c. 797 – 21 January 861 AD) was a German hermit and is revered as a Catholic and Orthodox saint. He is known as the "Martyr of Hospitality." His feast day is 21 January.

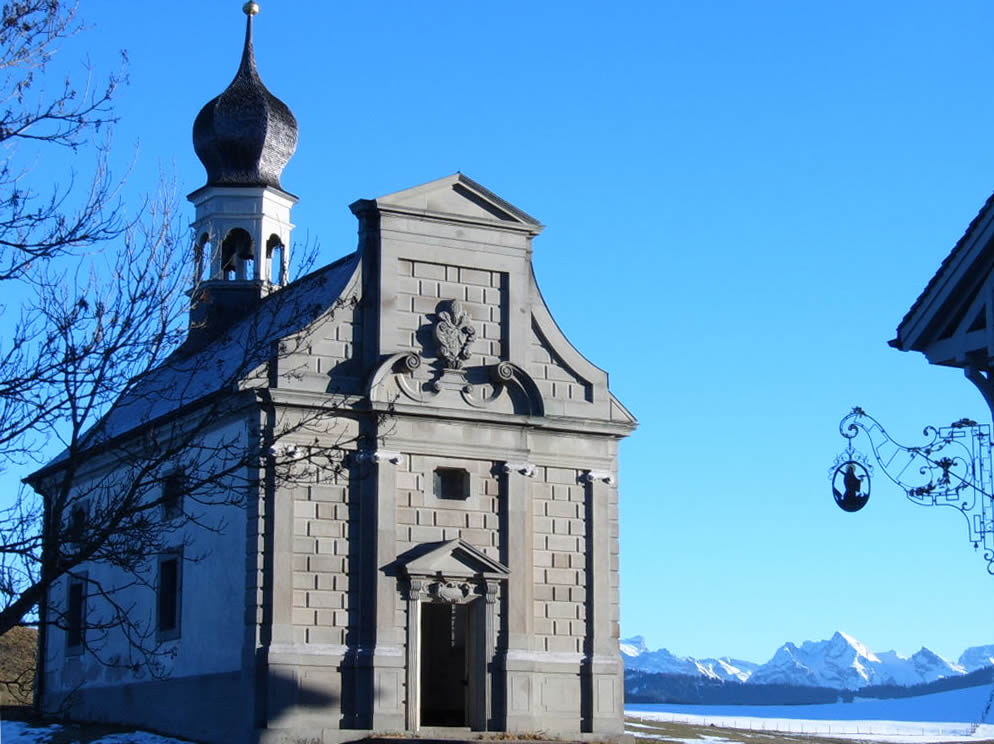
Meinrad chapel on Etzel Pass

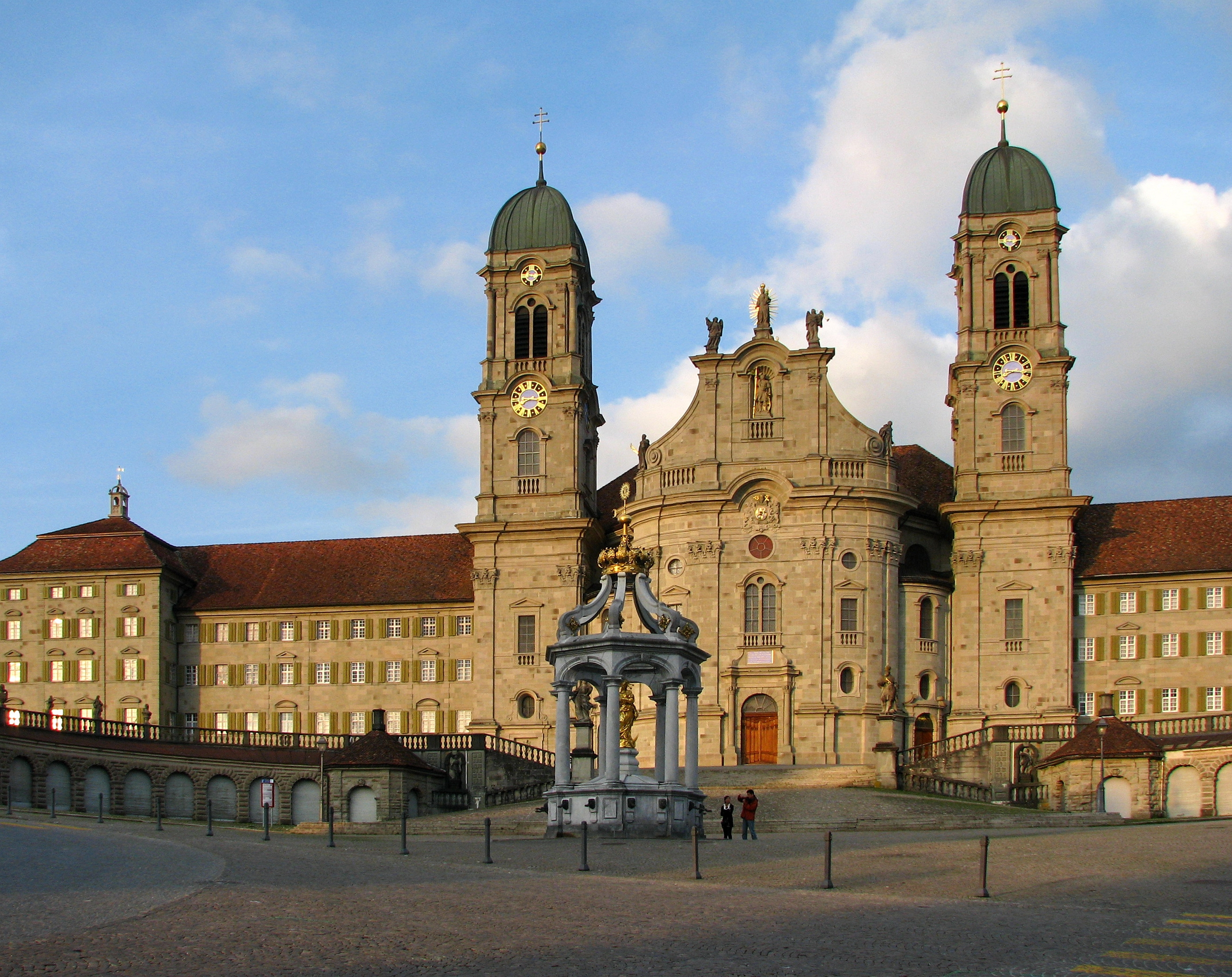
Einsiedeln Abbey

== Life ==
Meinrad was born into the family of the Counts of Hohenzollern and was educated at the abbey school of Reichenau, an island in Lake Constance, under his kinsmen, the Benedictine Abbots Hatto and Erlebald. There he became a monk and was ordained a priest.

After some years at Reichenau, and the dependent priory at Benken, St. Gallen near Lake Zurich, around 829 he embraced an eremitical life and established his hermitage on the slopes of Etzel Pass, taking with him a wonder-working statue of the Virgin Mary which he had been given by the Hildegard (abbess of Fraumünster) of Zurich. Because so many people sought him out, in 835 he retreated to a hermitage in the forest on the site of today's monastery in Einsiedeln. Inspired by the Desert Fathers, Meinrad practiced a strict asceticism. Gifts presented to him he passed on to the poor. He was killed in 861 by two robbers who wanted the treasures which they believed pilgrims had left at the shrine. Meinrad is known as the Martyr of Hospitality.

Over the next eighty years, the hermitage was occupied by a succession of hermits. One of them, named Eberhard, previously Provost of Strasburg, erected a monastery, Einsiedeln Abbey, and became its first abbot. Meinrad was originally buried at Reichenau, but his relics were returned to Einsiedeln in 1029.

== Veneration ==
During the Middle Ages, Einsiedeln became a popular place of pilgrimage for people from southern Germany, Switzerland, and Alsace. Meinrad's cell became the shrine of the Black Madonna of Einsiedeln. Over the years dust and the smoke of candles, oil lamps and incense darkened the image. In 1803 the hands and face were painted black.

The Chapel St. Meinrad at the summit of the Etzel Pass is first mentioned in the 13th century. The chapel and a nearby inn are located on the pilgrimage route of Camino de Santiago, which continues from the Zurich Oberland over the Etzel Pass to Einsiedeln and from there to the northern Spanish town of Santiago de Compostela.

The Feast Day of St. Meinrad is on 21 January.

St. Meinrad Archabbey in St. Meinrad, Indiana, is named for him.

== See also ==
- Einsiedeln Abbey, Switzerland
- Hohenzollern
- Saint Meinrad School of Theology
- St. Meinrad Archabbey, Indiana
