= Barbara Schmid-Federer =

Swiss politician

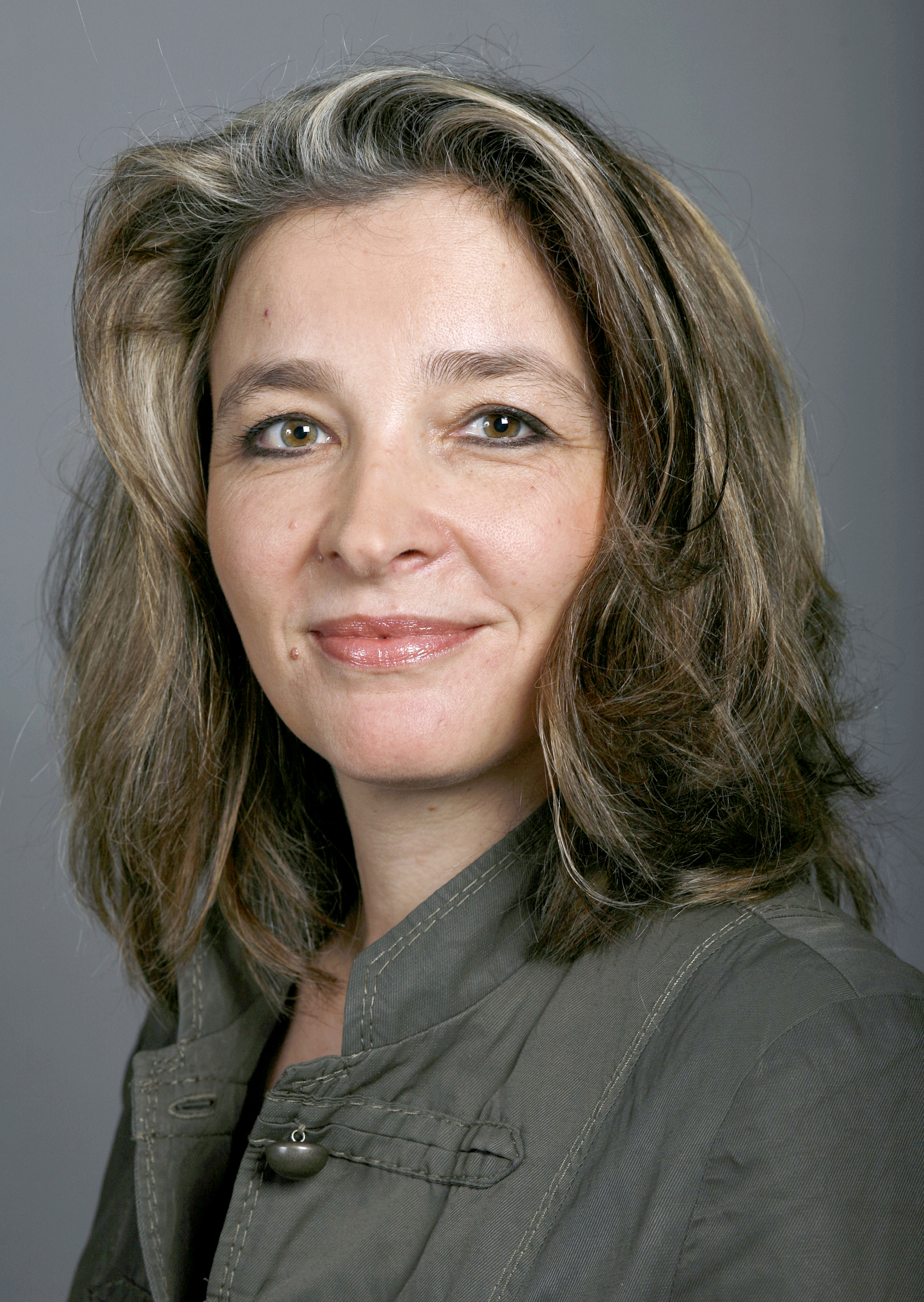
- Schmid-Federer in 2007

Former President of the Swiss Red Cross
- In office June 2022 – June 2023
- Preceded by: Thomas Heiniger

Vice President of Pro Juventute
- Incumbent
- Assumed office April 2022
- Preceded by: Stefan Portmann

President of Pro Juventute
- In office November 2019 – April 2022
- Preceded by: Josef Felder
- Succeeded by: Stefan Portmann

Member of the National Council
- In office 2007–2018
- Succeeded by: Philipp Kutter

Personal details
- Born: Barbara Federer; 10 November 1965 (age 60) Zürich, Canton of Zürich, Switzerland
- Party: CVP
- Spouse: Lorenz Schmid
- Children: 2
- Education: University of Zurich
- Occupation: politician, philanthropist, schoolteacher
- Website: schmid-federer.ch

Barbara Schmid-Federer (born 10 November 1965) is a Swiss politician, educator, and philanthropist. A member of the Christian Democratic People's Party of Switzerland, she was elected to a seat in the National Council in 2007, serving until 2018. As a member of the National Council, Schmid-Federer spearheaded family policy and children's safety initiatives, including public breastfeeding and cyberbullying prevention in her platforms. She was appointed as president of Pro Juventute in 2019 and served in that capacity until 2022, when she assumed the role of Vice President. She served as President of the Swiss Red Cross between 2022 and 2023.

== Early life, family, and education ==
Barbara Federer was born on 10 November 1965 in Zürich, the daughter of an international businessman. She is a member of the Federer family, who are part of the Bürgergemeinde of Berneck, St. Gallen, and is the sister of the Catholic prelate Urban Federer, who serves as the Abbot of Einsiedeln Abbey. She is the great-great granddaughter of the politician Josef Zemp, who was the first member of a conservative party to be elected to the Federal Council of Switzerland and later served as Swiss President. She is also a relative of the politician Ida Glanzmann-Hunkeler and tennis player Roger Federer.

She grew up speaking German and French. In 1984, she graduated from Kantonsschule Hohe Promenade in Zürich. She went on to study French philology, Spanish literature, comparative literature, and journalism studies at the University of Zurich from 1985 to 1991. She also studied at the Sorbonne in Paris and in Granada. After graduating in 1991, Schmid-Federer completed a language homestay in the United States.

== Career ==
=== Education ===
After completing her language study in the United States, Schmid-Federer returned to Europe in 1991 to work as a high school teacher at the Free High School in Zürich and at a school in Paris. From 1994 to 1997, she served as an assistant to the President of ETH Zurich, later taking over the management of the Dual Career Advice Office from 1998 to 2002. She also helped appoint foreign professors to ETH Zurich.

=== Politics ===
Schmid-Federer was elected to the National Council in the 2007 Swiss federal election on 21 October 2007, with a platform of ending cyberbullying and establishing protection for children using the internet. She served as a member of the Legal Affairs Committee during her first term in office. After her re-election on 23 October 2011, she served as a member of the Judiciary Commission GK of the National Council and, from 2011 to 2018, she served on the Commission for Social Security and Health SGK. From 2014 to 2018, she served as Co-President of the Parliamentary Group on Family Policy. Schmid-Federer launched a media initiative to provide breastfeeding zones in restaurants and pharmacies. As a committee spokesperson, she was one of few native German-speakers permitted to speak French in the National Council. She was succeeded by Philip Kutter in the National Council.

=== Philanthropy and charity ===
Since 2 November 2011, Schmid-Federer has served as President of the Swiss Red Cross in the Canton of Zürich. She has been a member of the Red Cross Council since 2018 and a board member of Pro Juventute since January 2019. In June 2019, she was elected as Vice President of the Swiss Red Cross and, in June 2022, she succeeded Thomas Heiniger as President of the Swiss Red Cross. In November 2019, she succeeded Josef Felder as the President of Pro Juventute. She later assumed the role of Vice President of Pro Juventute, due to her presidential nomination at the Swiss Red Cross.

She served on the Board of Trustees of Pro Mente Sana from 2018 to 2022, on the board of directors of TopPharm Pharmacy Paradeplatz since 2002, and as a member of the board of directors of Radio Zürisee AG since 2008. From 2009 to 2018, she was a member of the board of trustees of the Greina Foundation and, from 2008 to 2010, she was an advisory board member of the Swisscleantech Business Association. She has also served as a member of the advisory board of the Engelberg Sports School and of the Swiss Police IT Congress.

As president of the Swiss Red Cross, she was active in advocating for refugees in Switzerland. She resigned as President of the Swiss Red Cross in June 2023.

== Personal life ==
Schmid-Federer is married to Lorenz Schmid, a CVP politician who sat on the Cantonal Council of Zürich until 2022. They have two children.
