= Swiss Red Cross =

Swiss humanitarian organization

- Schweizerisches Rotes Kreuz; Croix-Rouge suisse Croce Rossa Svizzera; Crusch Cotschna svizra
- Logo of the society in German
- Formation: 1866
- Purpose: Humanitarian aid
- Headquarters: Bern, Switzerland
- Region served: Switzerland
- President: Thomas Zeltner
- Parent organization: International Federation of Red Cross and Red Crescent Societies
- Website: www.redcross.ch

The Swiss Red Cross (German: Schweizerisches Rotes Kreuz, French: Croix-Rouge suisse, Italian: Croce Rossa Svizzera, Romansh: Crusch Cotschna svizra), or SRC (SRK in German, CRS in French and Italian), is the national Red Cross society for Switzerland.

The SRC was founded in 1866 in Bern, Switzerland. In accordance with the Geneva Red Cross Agreement and its recognition through the International Red Cross and Red Crescent Movement, it is a member of the International Federation of Red Cross and Red Crescent Societies. The SRC is Switzerland's oldest and largest relief agency, made up of 24 cantonal leagues, five rescue organizations, three foundations and two societies.

== History ==
=== Foundation and first year ===
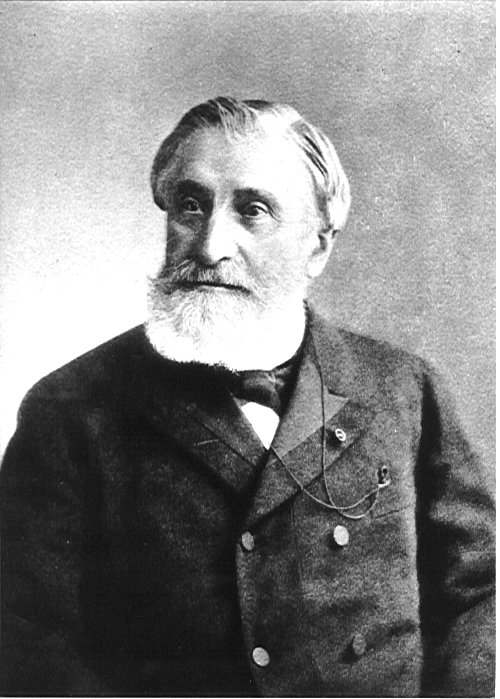
Gustave Moynier

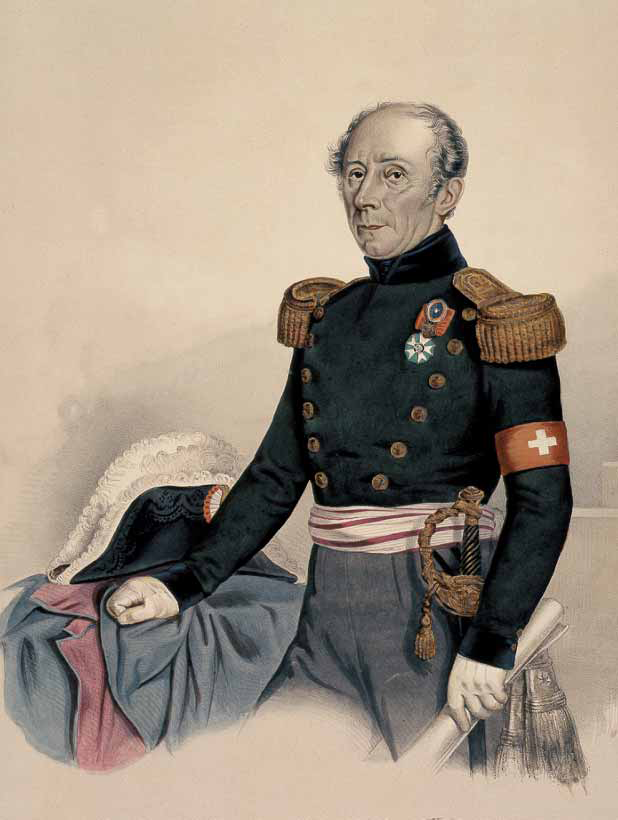
Guillaume-Henri Dufour

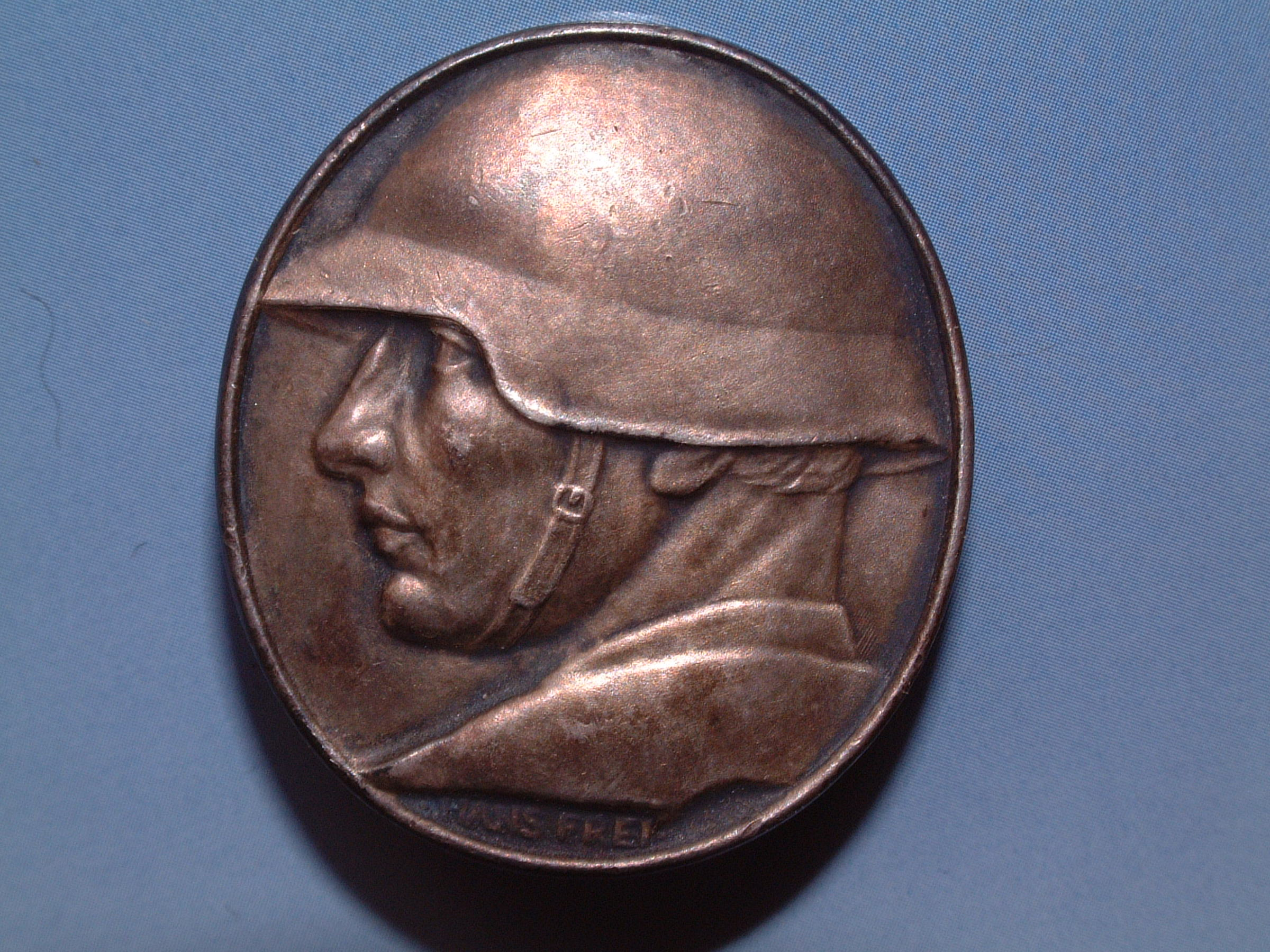
Medal issued by SRC to raise funds for "soldiers and their families" c. 1919

The Swiss Red Cross was established on 17 July 1866 at the instigation of Federal Councillor Jakob Dubs and the Red Cross members Gustave Moynier and Guillaume-Henri Dufour. After its foundation, the SRC named itself an "aid organisation [Hülfsverein] for Swiss soldiers and their families".

Building the national organisation was, however, full of difficulties. For one thing, there was very little consistency in the organisation of Switzerland at the federal level at this time, and for another, the organisation was hindered by political and confessional arguments. Also, Switzerland's neutrality and the existence of the International Committee of the Red Cross as an institution in Swiss civil society posed further difficulties.

In 1882 the Zurich Pfarrer Walter Kempin founded the "Centralverein des Schweizerischen Roten Kreuzes" (Central Verein of the Swiss Red Cross), and was its leader until 1885. It lasted until the start of the 20th century, with the appointment of the doctor Walther Sahli as standing Central Secretary in 1898 from the Centralverein and with the Hülfsverein founded by Dubs, Moynier, and Dufour beginning to consolidate the SRC structures. As a result, cantonal and local sections were established, Red Cross nursing organisations were formed and transport sections were set up. In 1903 the official role of the SRC was codified in a decree of the Federal Assembly, as a promoter of nursing and in the service of the army.

With the invasion of the Bourbaki army in March 1871, the SRC saw its first action as an auxiliary arm. It counted, interned 85,000 for six weeks in Switzerland to furnish members of the French army medically.

=== First World War ===
In the First World War, the SRC was responsible for the social and material support of soldiers, such as by specially-equipped hospital trains (Sanitätszüge) for the repatriation of approximately 80,000 wounded soldiers to their own countries, and for treatment of wounded soldiers in Switzerland. A further focal point in the SRC's activities was helping in the efforts against the Spanish flu epidemic, raging in Switzerland and throughout Europe in 1918.

=== Inter-war years ===
In the inter-war years, the SRC delivered – among other things – food aid to other countries, such as to Vienna in 1919 and to Russia (suffering from famine) in 1922.

=== Second World War ===
During the Second World War, the SRC provided for the support of the civil population and the army with material and auxiliary personnel and organized a blood donation service. It also promoted nursing training. It provided for 180,000 children to come to Switzerland in the form of the "Kinderhilfe" and provided for civilians and soldiers interned in Switzerland. In almost all the countries of Europe, it had own aid programmes or was involved in those set up by others.

=== After 1945 ===
The SRC had its national and international meaning strengthened by both world wars and so from 1945 it expanded its scope and gained new recognition both at home and abroad, shifting its focus from military to civilian aid. It made a large contribution to forming the Swiss public health system, establishing and running a blood donation service and helping in outpatient care and occupational therapy. Helping with transport and house visits, and training carers, the SRC is also engaged in the social-medical area, and was also in large part responsible for the increasing professionalization of hospitals, nursing and rescue work.

The SRC also actively supports refugees, asylum seekers and migrants and works in reconstruction and aid work. In international development, it is a partner of Switzerland's "Direktion für Entwicklung und Zusammenarbeit" (direction for development and collaboration) and the International Federation of Red Cross and Red Crescent Societies, and is well known in the Red Cross movement as being one of the most active national societies on the international scene.

== Organisation ==
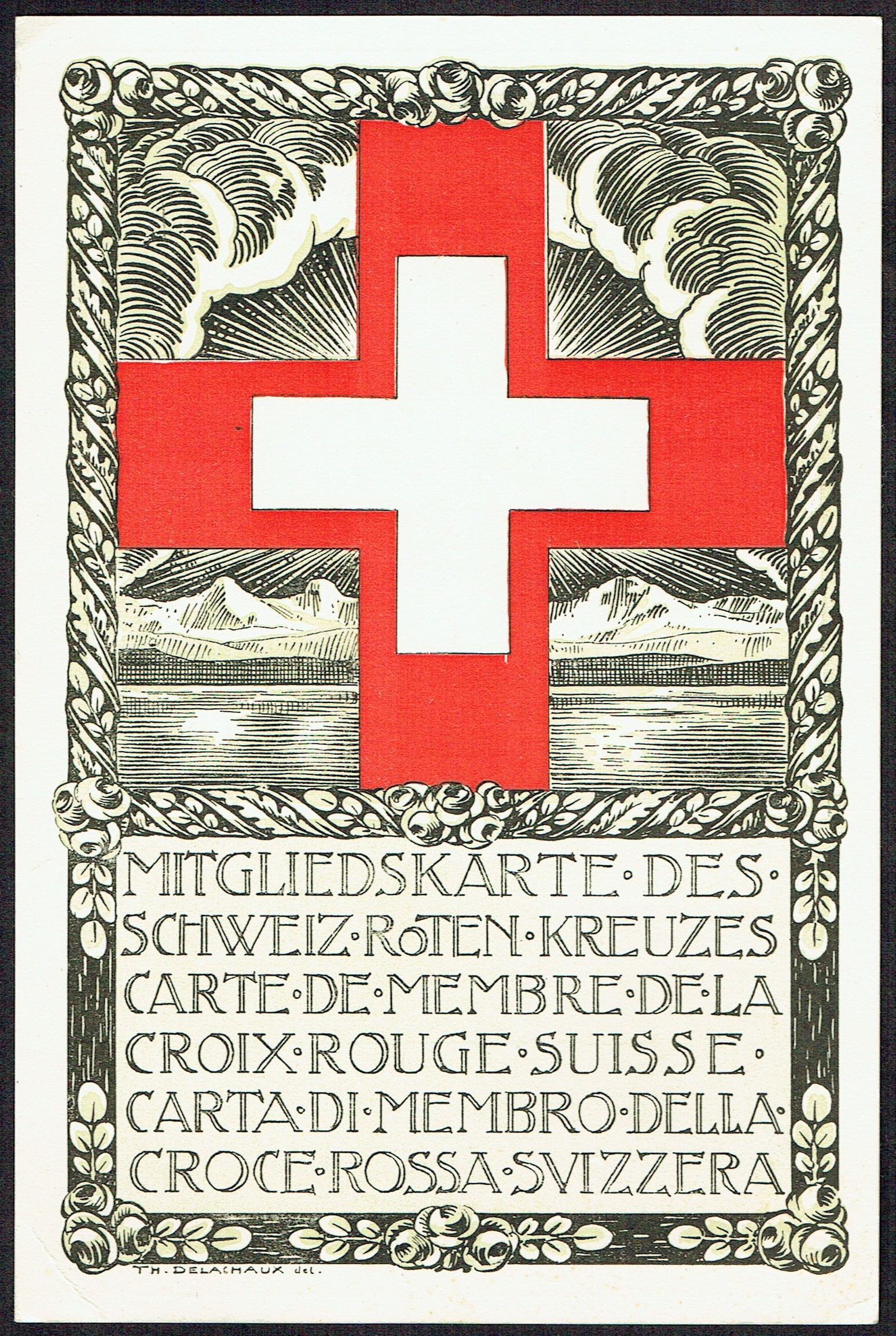
Front of a 1921 membership card of the Swiss Red Cross

In accordance with Switzerland itself, the Swiss Red Cross is a federally structured association based in Bern. In 2007 it had 4,814 employees, with 2,518 in full-time positions, as well as 50,000 volunteers who work about 1.36 million hours.

Its central organ is the "Red Cross Assembly", made up of 64 delegates from the Cantonal Associations and 33 members of the rescue organizations. The 9-member "Red Cross Council" deals with strategic decisions and is supported through the offices of the SRC. The President (since 2001 the lawyer and former State Councillor René Rhinow) represents the SRC and the "Red Cross Council", as well as being ex officio vice-president of the International Federation of Red Cross and Red Crescent Societies. Since 2008 the SRC's director is the economist, legal and social scientist Markus Mader.

20% of the SRC's funding comes from private donations, over 50% from the health services it provides, 13% from the public purse, and the remaining 17% from other sources. In 2007 the SRC's income was 750 million Swiss francs, with a balance of 1.7 million Swiss francs.

=== SRC Headquarters ===
The SRC offices in Bern and Wabern handle the day-to-day business of the SRC at national level. They carry out the instructions of the Red Cross Assembly and the Red Cross Council and are the centre of expertise and services for the whole SRC Group. The SRC Headquarters are divided into four departments: International Cooperation (disaster relief within Switzerland or abroad, reconstruction, development cooperation), Health & Integration (health, integration, SRC Outpatient Clinic for victims of torture and war, asylum, vocational training, fundamentals & development, Red Cross Service), marketing & communication, finance, human resources & logistics. The Management Services comprise the Management Secretariat, the Legal Service, the Delegate for International Relations, a Competence Centre for Youth and a Competence Centre for Voluntary Work, and Institutional Development.

=== Cantonal Associations ===
Similar to the federal structure of Switzerland, the SRC is a decentralized organization, with 24 cantonal associations throughout Switzerland. The 24 cantonal associations adjust their work to the needs of the local population in their catchment area. They are independent associations and rely on the commitment of more than 2,000 staff and over 10,000 volunteers. The cantonal associations mainly provide services in the health promotion, support and integration sectors. The services are intended for the elderly and the sick, the housebound and their family carers, families with children, and children and teenagers. For issues of nationwide significance, the cantonal associations work together. Their collaboration is coordinated by the National Conference of the Cantonal Red Cross Associations and the National Conference of Cantonal Association Managers. The governing body of the cantonal associations is the executive committee. The cantonal associations have their National Secretariat in Bern. The National Secretariat of the cantonal associations carries out the organizational and administrative work for the governing bodies of the cantonal associations.

=== The Rescue Organisations ===
1. Swiss Samaritans SSB/ASS: In Switzerland, there are more than 35,000 active Samaritans in around 1,200 local Samaritan associations. The SSB helps to ensure that every accident victim or anyone who suddenly falls ill receives appropriate first aid and that help is provided for anyone in need of physical or psychological assistance. In 2008 the first aid and rescue courses offered by the SSB were visited about 94.787 times.
2. Swiss Life-Saving Association SLRG/SSS: It is involved in accident prevention and lifesaving in all types of emergency situations, particularly in standing or flowing water. It has more than 27,000 members that belong to its local sections.
3. Swiss Army Medical Association SMSV/SSTS: It offers first aid, emergency assistance and CPR courses, medical service, youth work. It provides regular off-duty training in the medical service of the armed forces and rescue and medical services (non-military).
4. Swiss Disaster Dogs Association REDOG: For rescuing missing persons and those buried under rubble. REDOG offers training and deployment of search and rescue teams (dog & handler = team). It consists of approximately 650 members in 12 regional groups and is based on voluntary work.

=== Institutions ===
In certain sectors, the SRC has founded organizations that operate under private law (foundation or joint stock company) or civil law (association).

1. SRC Humanitarian Foundation: It is a charitable foundation established by the SRC with headquarters in Bern. It supports the Swiss Red Cross in its humanitarian work both in Switzerland and other countries. The proceeds generated from the foundation's assets are used to fund projects run by the SRC and other organizations of the International Red Cross & Red Crescent Movement.
2. SRC Blood Transfusion Service: It is a charitable joint stock company with the SRC as the majority shareholder and the 13 regional blood transfusion centres as minority shareholders. The work is regulated by cooperation agreements. The 13 regional blood transfusion services together with the 60 blood transfusion centres supply the hospitals in their respective regions. In cooperation with the Samaritan associations, mobile teams supply rural areas.

The government resolution passed in June 1951, which states that the provision of the "blood transfusion service for civil and military purposes" is one of the most important missions of the SRC, provides the legal basis for the activities of the Blood Transfusion Service.

1. Lindenhof Red Cross Nursing Foundation, Bern: It was recognized as an independent charitable foundation by the Grand Council of Bern Canton in 1908 and runs the Lindenhof Hospital and Lindenhof School:
2. Lindenhof Hospital: Founded in 1907, it is one of the largest private hospitals in Switzerland and offers a comprehensive range of primary and specialized medical care services. It provides education and clinical training facilities for the nursing sector and all the other medical professions.

The Lindenhof hospital is a private charitable hospital and is recognized as an official service provider by the Canton of Bern. It offers its services in accordance with the legal provisions and its facilities for every section of the community and for all insurance categories. The hospital does not receive any public funding. From 2008 to 2012, the Lindenhof hospital will be investing in major structural work to replace existing facilities so that it can offer progressive and efficient services.

1. Lindenhof School: One of the primary missions of the Lindenhof nursing school is to provide undergraduate and postgraduate training for qualified nursing professionals. The school was founded in 1899 and played a leading role in the training of nurses up until September 2007. Then on a resolution of the Bern government, all nursing schools were centralized. The Lindenhof Foundation is now one of the main institutions in the newly created Bern training centre for nursing. Despite this merger, the former Lindenhof school is still in existence and will remain active in the graduate training sector. In collaboration with vocational colleges, training courses will also be offered in the vocational college sector.

=== Other features ===
The Swiss Red Cross of Appenzell running in Heiden, Switzerland, in Appenzell Ausserrhoden the Henry Dunant Museum, dedicated to the life and work of Henry Dunant, the founder of the International Red Cross and Red Crescent Movement.

== Presidents ==
Presidents of the SRC and its precursor organisations:

- Jakob Dubs (1866–1872)
- Karl Schenk (1873–1882)
- Edmund von Steiger (1905–1908)
- Hans Konrad Pestalozzi (1908–1909)
- Isaak Iselin-Sarasin (1910–1918)
- Karl Bohny (1918–1928)
- Anton von Schulthess-Rechberg (1929–1938)
- Johannes von Muralt (1938–1946)
- Ambrosius von Albertini (1954–1968)
- Hans Haug (1968–1982)
- Kurt Bolliger (1982–1988)
- Karl Kennel (1988–1996)
- Franz Muheim (1996–2001)
- René Rhinow (2001–2011)
- Annemarie Huber-Hotz (2011–2019)
- Thomas Heiniger (2019–2022)
- Barbara Schmid-Federer (2022–2023)
- Thomas Zeltner (2023 – present)
