= Neue Zürcher Nachrichten =

- Type: Daily newspaper
- Founded: 1904
- Ceased publication: 1991
- Language: German
- City: Zurich
- Country: Switzerland
- OCLC number: 34961766

The Neue Zürcher Nachrichten (NZN; transl. New Zürich News) was a Catholic daily newspaper published in the city of Zurich from 1904 to 1991. The newspaper, founded as the Zürcher Nachrichten in Zürich in 1896, was closely associated with the Christlichsoziale Partei (Christian Social Party, today's Christian Democratic People's Party, CVP) and supported the establishment and consolidation of Catholic associations and Christian social party work around Zürich.

== History ==
=== From weekly newspaper to daily ===
From 1896, the Zürcher Nachrichten was published twice a week. It was the mouthpiece of the diaspora Catholics in Zürich, which at that time was still strongly influenced by Zwinglianism. At a meeting of the Katholisch-Konservativen Volkspartei (Catholic-Conservative People's Party) in Lucerne, it was stated that a large increase in the share of votes in the Catholic cantons was no longer possible. In order to advance to Zürich, the small Catholic paper was to be expanded into a first-class daily newspaper including a business association. On the initiative of the printer Theodat Bucher and the editor-in-chief of Die Ostschweiz, Georg Baumberger, who moved to Zürich, the Neue Zürcher Nachrichten was created.

=== Upswing and consolidation ===
Unlike many smaller Catholic newspapers, however, the NZN was always nationally oriented. This was also reflected in the fact that in 1929 around half of the copies printed were read outside the Canton of Zürich. The paper's easy-to-read, smug, sometimes slightly polemical style was appreciated. In the struggle of the Zürich Catholics for public recognition, the NZN was their mouthpiece. On the occasion of the newspaper's 50th anniversary, the Globus department store advertised: "We have been regularly advertising in the 'Neue Zürcher Nachrichten' for years, because we know how to assess the purchasing power of the approximately 200,000 Catholics in the Canton of Zürich as a considerable economic factor!" In 1963, at the height of Catholic integration efforts, Urs Bürgi became the first Catholic to be elected to the Government Council of the Canton of Zürich, the Roman Catholic Church was recognized under constitutional law, and the CSP sent five National Councillors to Bern, more than ever before.

In addition to the newspapers Vaterland and Die Ostschweiz, in the 1960s the NZN became an important partner of the small CVP newspapers, which had come under strong financial pressure and economic hardship. The following Catholic or CVP-affiliated newspapers appeared as front pages of the NZN, especially in the diaspora cantons: Neue Berner Nachrichten, Basler Volksblatt, Aargauer Volksblatt (Baden), Schwyzer Nachrichten (until 1975), and Hochwacht (Winterthur). After the Vaterland had also courted some of these papers, talks were held from 1969 onwards in order to join forces and create a large Catholic newspaper with regional editions in the long term. Out of fear of too great a loss of autonomy, a combination of advertisements, "Katholischer Pressering", was created in parallel in secret negotiations with the Basler Volksblatt, the Aargauer Volksblatt and the Solothurner Nachrichten.

=== Long decline from 1972 ===
The NZN itself and the support of its smaller partner newspapers could only be financed from the profits of the printing house in Zürich's Seefeld quarter. When this was no longer possible in the early 1970s due to overcapacity in the printing industry, the progressive Catholic NZN itself became the head of the rather conservative Ostschweiz. In 1972, the Börsig and Bucher families sold their shares in Neue Zürcher Nachrichten to the Orell Füssli company. The newspaper was now without a print shop. The Ostschweiz took over the delivery of the cover pages, production, shipping, collection and accounting in exchange for the subscription and advertising revenues. The costs of the editorial office in Zürich were borne by the church. In 1980, however, the Central Commission (the executive of the cantonal church) decided to abolish the subsidies and use the money to expand the parish newspaper somewhat.

=== NZN Press Club ===
Various fundraising campaigns were held to strengthen the newspaper. In later years, the publishing house was brought back from St. Gallen to Zürich and the editorial staff was equipped with computers so that the manuscripts no longer had to be sent by express to St. Gallen and retyped there. This was financed by the NZN Press Club, an association membership in which cost 1000 francs.

=== End ===
Due to the recognition of the Catholic Church and the integration of Catholics into public life, cohesion and struggle were no longer necessary to the same extent as before. At the same time, a social change began around 1968, which severely affected both the churches and the ideological press. While the inner Catholic binding forces became weaker, for financial reasons it was not possible to expand the product to enlarge its reach outside its own milieu. In the dispute over the Diocese of Chur, the newspaper got caught between the opposing sides and lost many subscribers. After the circulation had fallen from 12,000 (1985) to 5000 (1991), the financial situation was unsustainable, and the newspaper was discontinued at the end of April.

Founded in 1946, NZN Buchverlag published collections of articles and essays in the daily newspaper and quickly developed into an internationally renowned art book publisher. In 1972 it was taken over by the Roman Catholic Church of the Canton of Zürich, which ceded it in 2005 to become the Catholic line of the Protestant Theologischer Verlag Zürich of the Evangelical Reformed Church of the Canton of Zürich.

== Editors ==
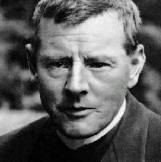
Writer Heinrich Federer was editor of the Neue Zürcher Nachrichten from 1899 to 1902.

Georg Baumberger took over the management when the daily Neue Zürcher Nachrichten was founded. From the end of 1899 to 1902, the writer Heinrich Federer was editor-in-chief, and in the 1920s and 1930s, Emil Buomberger, later a CSP city councillor, headed the editorial office. Later, Hermann Odermatt took over this office for many years. One of the most renowned Catholic publicists, Carl Doka (1896–1980), was editor of the newspaper from 1946 to 1952, having previously headed the editorial staff of the Ostschweiz since 1932.

== Supplements ==
The Neue Zürcher Nachrichten was published seven times a week, with an additional morning paper on Monday. Later it was decided to publish only six editions a week. In addition to a trade section edited by the publishing house (Wirtschaftsbund), there were a number of weekly Sunday supplements: Katholische Kultur ("Catholic Culture"), Wissenschaft und Technik ("Science and Technology"), Literarische Warte, Die Welt der Frau ("Woman's World"), Die Scholle and Der Erzähler. Katholische Kultur later became Christ und Kultur ("Christ and Culture") and Religion aktuell ("Current Religion"), after the dissolution of the NZN Central Editorial Office, editorially supervised by the Vaterland, which appeared in all Catholic newspapers in Switzerland.

== Bibliography ==
- Neue Zürcher Nachrichten (ed.): 50 Jahre ... (1904–1954) ("50 Years ... (1904–1954)"). Zürich, 1954.
- Paul F. Bütler: Das Unbehagen an der Moderne: Grundzüge katholischer Zeitungslehre der deutschen Schweiz während der Herausforderung des Modernismus um 1900/1914 ("The uneasiness about modernity: basic features of Catholic newspaper theory in German-speaking Switzerland during the challenge of modernism around 1900/1914"). 2002: Schwabe (Chapter 7).
- Franco Luzzatto: Öffentlichkeitsdefizit der katholischen Kirche: Organisationskommunikation und Kommunikationsstruktur der katholischen Kirche Schweiz – Bedingungen für ein Ende der Stagnationskrise ("Public deficit of the Catholic Church: organizational communication and communication structure of the Swiss Catholic Church - conditions for an end to the stagnation crisis"). Freiburg i. Ü., 2002: Saint-Paul.
