= Swiss bourgeoisie =

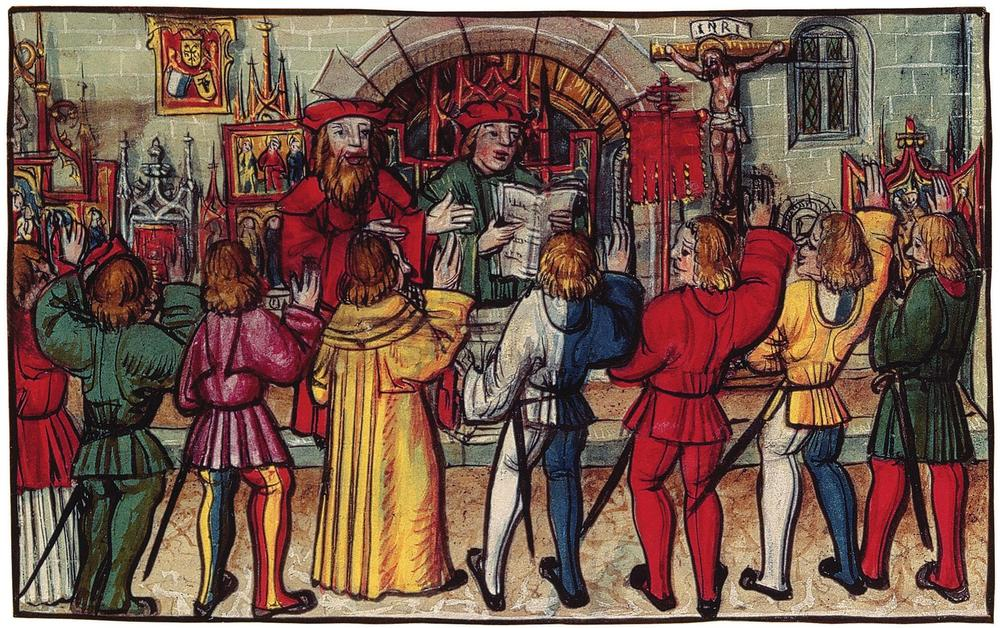
Assembly of the bourgeois of Lucerne, 1508 (illustration from the Luzerner Schilling)

In some cantons of Switzerland, the bourgeoisie is both a form of local community right and a personal right.

The system of bourgeoisie stems from medieval urban law which was common to all the cities of Western Europe (see: Bourgeois of Brussels). The bourgeoisie, or bourgeois commune (i.e. municipality), is a local "community" that still exists in certain cantons, in which inhabitants originating from that specific commune, called "old bourgeois", as opposed to the new inhabitants, participate. This current bourgeoisie system, which can be traced back to the law on the communes of 1866, has gradually lost importance. However, these institutions still manage some hospitals and, in some cantons, confer a "right to bourgeoisie", sometimes prior to Swiss naturalization. This system is linked to the place of origin.

There is a "Swiss Federation of Bourgeoisies and Corporations" whose roles include the defence of "maintenance of bourgeois institutions".

In Switzerland, there was a "right to bourgeoisie" (a sort of city right), which was a charter of freedoms and rights contracted between the nobility and the bourgeoisie. The prerequisite for belonging to this bourgeoisie was possession of real estate in the heart of the city.

== Cantonal particularities ==
In the canton of Valais, there are still many active bourgeoisies. Along with the municipal commune that deals with resident citizens, one generally finds the bourgeois commune, whose scope particularly affects the citizens who originate from the municipality with regard to the law on nationality. Thus, one can be Swiss and residing in a municipality, without having the right of bourgeoisie.

In contrast, in the canton of Geneva (which replaced the Republic of Geneva), the bourgeoisie of Geneva have had no influence since 1798. The title of bourgeois in Geneva has no value and gives no additional rights since that date.

== Honorary bourgeoisie ==
Honorary bourgeoisie is given to certain people, who strive for the well-being of the country or a municipality. It is not hereditary and has no effect on nationality.

Napoleon III was a bourgeois of the municipality of Salenstein.

The former king of Sweden Gustav IV Adolf was a bourgeois of the commune of Basel.

== Notable bourgeoisie families ==
- Pache Family
- Federer family
- Indermaur family

== See also ==
- Bourgeoisie of Geneva
- Swiss nobility
- Place of origin
- Bourgeois of Brussels
- Bourgeois of Paris
