= Georg Holzherr =

Georg Holzherr OSB
- Abbot of Maria Einsiedeln
- Church: Catholic Church
- See: Einsiedeln Abbey
- In office: 3 November 1969 – 9 November 2001
- Predecessor: Raymund Tschudi
- Successor: Martin Werlen

Orders
- Ordination: 24 June 1953

Personal details
- Born: 22 January 1927 Neuendorf, Canton of Solothurn, Switzerland
- Died: 26 February 2012 (aged 85) Altdorf, Canton of Uri, Switzerland

Georg Holzherr (22 January 1927 – 26 February 2012) was the Catholic abbot of Einsiedeln Abbey, Switzerland.

Holzherr became a member of the Order of Saint Benedict in 1949 and was ordained a priest in 1953. In 1969, Holzherr became abbot of the Einsiedlen Abbey retiring in 2001.
