= Bourgeoisie of Geneva =

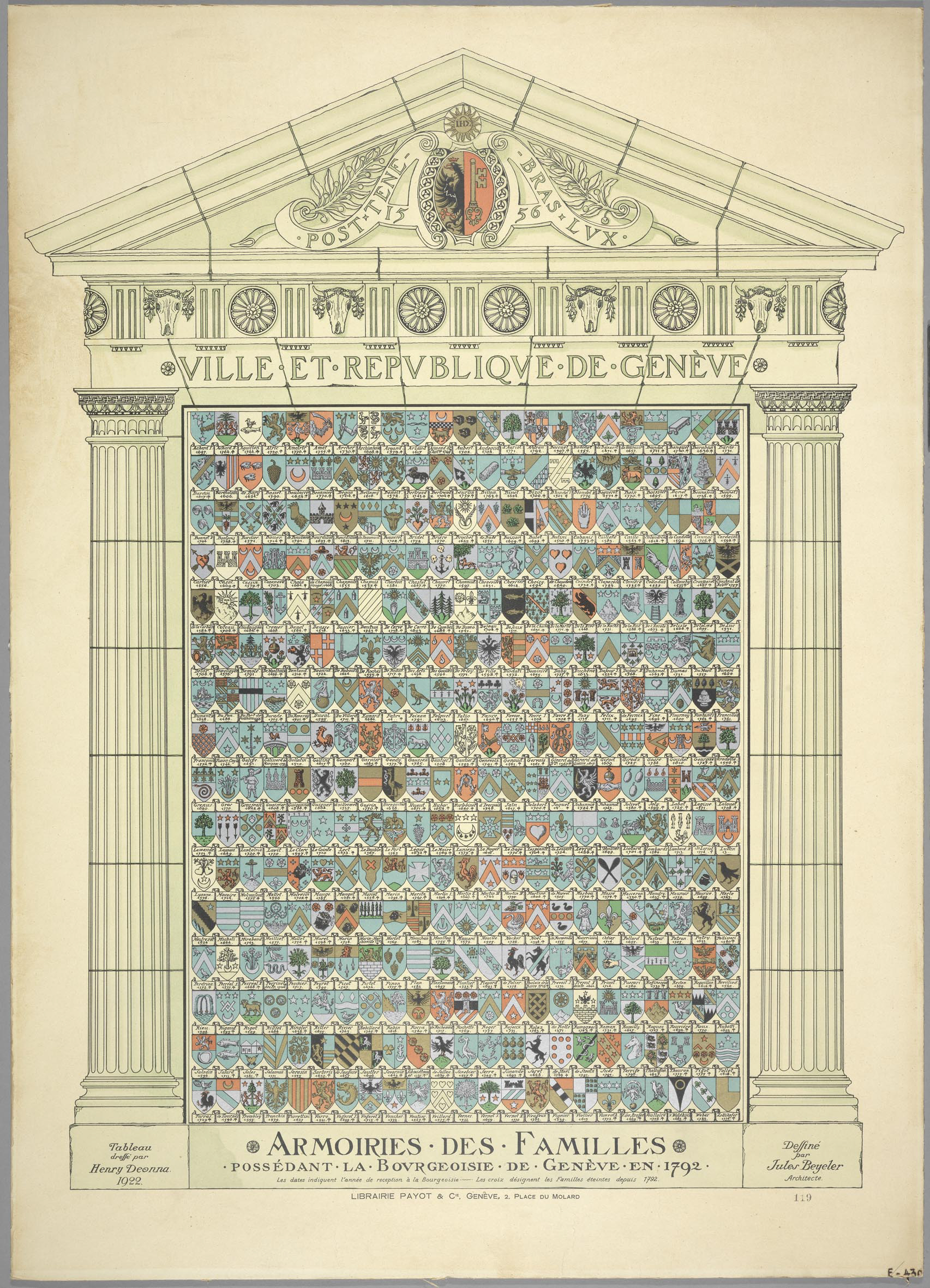
Arms of the families that had the Bourgeoisie of Geneva in 1792

The inhabitants of the seigneurie and the Republic of Geneva were divided into four orders of people: the Citoyens, the Bourgeois, the Habitants, and the Natifs. The Citoyens and the Bourgeois formed the bourgeoisie and, thus the patrician class of the Republic.

== Status ==
- The Citoyens (citizens) were offspring of bourgeois and born in the city. Only their males could reach the status of magistrate.
- The Bourgeois were offspring of bourgeois or citizens who were born in a foreign country, or foreigners who had acquired the right of the bourgeoisie from the Magistrate. To gain access to the bourgeoisie, they had to buy it. In addition to the sum of money, it was customary to pay for a "seillot" and often a firearm. The bourgeoisie acquired services for free or at a reduced price. The bourgeois could be on the General Council and the Council of Two Hundred.
- The Habitants (inhabitants): foreigners who had permission from the Magistrate to live in the city. They had to pay a housing tax. The inhabitants could access the bourgeoisie after living a certain number of years in Geneva.
- The Natifs (natives): sons of foreigners allowed to live there, born in the city. They were deprived of any political right and could not practice certain professions.

== History ==
The assembly of the bourgeois and citizens of Geneva constituted the General Council. The number of bourgeois entitled to vote in the General Council never exceeded fifteen hundred. The General Council originally elected the Geneva Trustees, magistrates responsible for the administration of the commune, for a period of one year. Later, it appointed the Council of Two Hundred. Most citizens of Geneva came from neighboring Savoy because many of them worked and participated in the administration of the city of Geneva.

Revolts against nepotism and the influx of foreigners, particularly French Protestant refugees whom Calvin forced into the bourgeoisie to ensure his domination. He thus secured a majority in the elections of 1554. During the eighteenth century, Geneva was marked by many political troubles stemming from the inequality of rights between Genevois. The bourgeois, who enjoyed a privileged status, and their descendants, the citizens, held the upper hand: had all the political rights and many economic privileges. In front of them, the inhabitants and their descendants, the natives, form a population without political rights and hampered in its economic activities. Due to the French invasion of Switzerland, the bourgeoisie of Geneva lost their privilege in 1798. All Genevans have been ordinary citizens since that date.

The capacity of Bourgeois, that is to say of citizen of a city having political rights not available to other residents, forms the base of the urban organization of cities. This urban system in Europe for many cities dates back to Greco-Latin antiquity, others were founded around the year 1000. According to Pierre Bonenfant, this system of urban civilization developed in parallel to the rural civilization rooted in the Neolithic era.

== Notable families ==
- Anspach family
- Pictet family
- Mallet family
- Saussure family
- Turrettini family

== See also ==
- History of Geneva
- Council of Two Hundred
- Swiss bourgeoisie
- Patrician (post-Roman Europe)
- Bourgeoisie
- Bourgeois of Brussels
- Bourgeois of Paris
- Seven Noble Houses of Brussels
- Guilds of Brussels
