= Philipp Kutter =

Swiss politician and historian (born 1975)

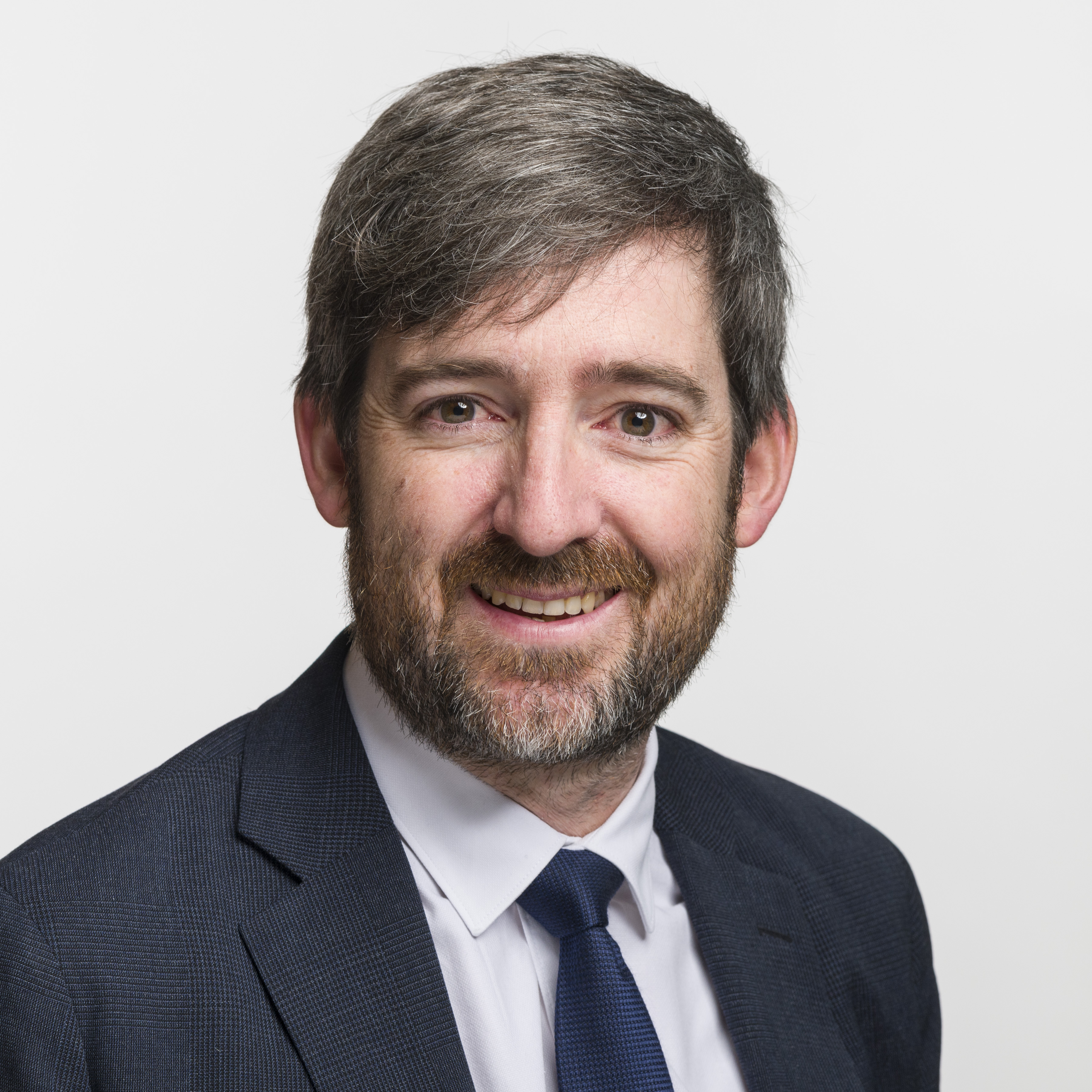
- Official portrait, 2019

Member of the National Council (Switzerland)
- Incumbent
- Assumed office 11 June 2018
- Preceded by: Barbara Schmid-Federer
- Constituency: Canton of Zürich

Mayor of Wädenswil
- In office 2010–2026

Personal details
- Born: Philipp Mario Kutter; 31 August 1975 (age 51) Altstätten, Switzerland
- Party: The Centre
- Spouse: Anja Kutter (m. 2012)
- Children: 2
- Education: University of Zurich (Licentiate)
- Occupation: Historian; journalist; consultant; politician
- Website: Official website Parliament website

Military service
- Allegiance: Switzerland
- Branch/service: Swiss Armed Forces
- Rank: Soldier

Philipp Mario Kutter (German pronunciation: [ˈfɪlɪp ˈkʊtɐ]; born 31 August 1975) is a Swiss historian, journalist, public relations consultant and politician who currently serves as member of the National Council (Switzerland) for The Centre since 2018. From 2010 to 2026 he served as mayor (city president) of Wädenswil. He previously served on the Cantonal Council of Zürich between 2007 and 2018.

In early February 2023, he broke two cervical vertebrae while skiing, resulting in paralysis of his legs and right arm. Consequently, he received inpatient care at the Swiss Paraplegic Centre in Nottwil until the end of October 2023. During this time, he delegated all tasks at the municipal, regional, and national levels to his deputies. In August 2023, he was able to partially resume his duties as the city's mayor. By the end of 2023, he returned to live at home.

== Early life and education ==
Kutter was born 31 August 1975 in Altstätten, Switzerland. His parents hailed from the St. Gallen Rhine Valley and relocated to Wädenswil on Lake Zurich in 1982 when Kutter was seven years old. His father was a service manager at Wild Heerbrugg, a machinery company. His mother is a former flight attendant at Swissair and later secretary.

In 1993, Kutter obtained his Maturity (Typus B), in Zurich. He then studied history, communications and political science at the University of Zurich graduating with a Licentiate.

== Politics ==
Kutter has been serving as member of the National Council (Switzerland) since 11 June 2018. From 2010 to 2026 he served as mayor (city president) of Wädenswil. Previously he served on the Cantonal Council of Zürich from 21 May 2007 to 31 July 2018.

== Personal life ==
On 21 January 2012, Kutter married his wife Anja. They have two daughters and reside in Wädenswil on Lake Zurich.
