= Federer family =

Swiss family

Federer
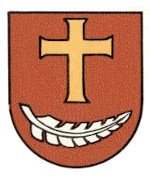
- Coat of Arms of the Federers von Berneck
- Country: Switzerland
- Origin: Berneck, St. Gallen, Switzerland
- Titles: Ammann of Berneck
- Connected families: In der Maur
- Traditions: Roman Catholicism

The Federer family is an old Swiss family that is part of the bourgeoisie of Berneck, St. Gallen. The family originated in the 16th century with members holding local government offices under the Prince-Abbots of the Abbey of St. Gallen. Notable members of the family include the retired tennis player Roger Federer, the Catholic priest and writer Heinrich Federer, and the politician Barbara Schmid-Federer.

== History ==
The Federer family originates in the 16th century from the village of Berneck, St. Gallen in northeastern Switzerland, near the Austrian border. As part of the Swiss bourgeoisie, members of the family were entitled to positions in the local government. The name Federer translates from the Swiss German word for "feather" or "quill", referencing the family's role as scribes in Berneck. In 1544, Ulrich Federer served as the Ammann of Berneck for the Prince-Abbots of St. Gallen. Sebastian Federer served as Ammann in 1665. The Federer family coat of arms includes a gold cross atop a white feather on a red shield.

In 1525, during the Reformation in Switzerland, the population of Berneck converted from Catholicism to Protestantism, following the teachings of Huldrych Zwingli. By 1532, the Federer family had converted back to Catholicism.

In 1848 Berneck suffered a great fire that destroyed over one hundred buildings in the village. A branch of the Federer family were blamed by the rest of the clan for the fire, and were cast out of the municipality. Members of the family later settled in Baden, Eichberg, St. Gallen, and Rebstein.

In 2019, Jakob Federer served as the vice president of Berneck.

== Notable members ==
- Josef Anton Sebastian Federer (1793–1868), Swiss theologian and politician
- Heinrich Federer (1866–1928), Swiss writer and Catholic priest
- Barbara Schmid-Federer (b. 1965), Swiss politician
- Urban Federer (b. 1968), Swiss Catholic abbot
- Mirka Federer (b. 1978), Swiss retired tennis player
- Roger Federer (b. 1981), Swiss retired tennis player

== See also ==
- Federer (surname)
