= Etzel Pass =

Mountain pass in Schwyz, Switzerland

- Location within Alps
- Elevation: 950 metres (3,120 ft)
- Traversed by: 9

Third Approach
- Location: Switzerland
- Range: Alps
- Coordinates: 47°10′24″N 08°46′20″E

Etzel Pass (el. 950 m.) is a mountain pass in the Alps in the canton of Schwyz in Switzerland.

It connects Pfäffikon and Einsiedeln. It lies on the route of pilgrimage to the abbey at Einsiedeln and on to Santiago de Compostela

== See also ==
- List of highest paved roads in Europe
- List of mountain passes
