= Thomas Zeltner =

Swiss physician and politician

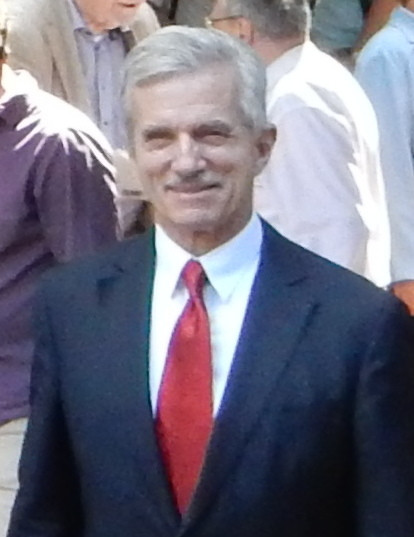
- Thomas Zeltner in 2025
- Born: 15 November 1947 (age 78); Bern, Switzerland
- Occupations: President Swiss Red Cross, Chairman WHO Foundation, physician, lawyer, and former Secretary of Health of Switzerland
- Known for: President of the Swiss Red Cross; Chairman WHO Foundation; former secretary of health of Switzerland; professor of public health at the University of Bern, Switzerland; president of the Swiss Commission for UNESCO; and board member of the Medical University of Vienna

Thomas Zeltner (born 15 November 1947) is a Swiss physician and lawyer. He is the current president of the Swiss Red Cross and chairman of the WHO Foundation. He was also the former Secretary of Health of Switzerland Federal Department of Home Affairs FDHA. He has a long history in public health and has repeatedly been ranked among the 12 most influential political figures of Switzerland.

Zeltner is a professor at the University of Bern, Switzerland, in Public Health. He chairs the Swiss Research Institute for Public Health and Addiction (Zürich) and is President of the UNESCO Commission of Switzerland. He is also a member of the University Council of the Medical University of Vienna.

== Past ==
Zeltner was born on 15 November 1947 in Bern, Switzerland. He graduated with an M.D. and an LL.M. (master's in law) from the University of Berne. He specialized in human pathology and forensic medicine before becoming the head of Medical Services at the Bern University Hospital. He held various faculty positions at the University of Bern and at the Harvard School of Public Health. He is Doctor of law (honoris causa) of the University of Neuchâtel, Switzerland.

In 1991, the Swiss Government appointed Zeltner as the 8th Director-General of the Swiss National Health Authority and Secretary of Health of Switzerland, a position he held until the end of 2009.

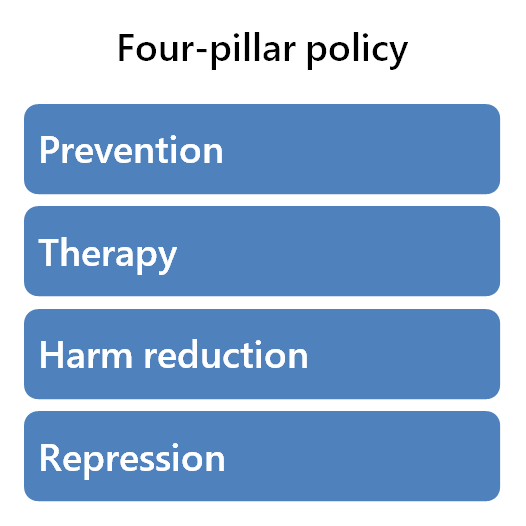
The 4 pillars of Switzerland's drug policy: prevention, treatment, harm reduction and repression.

Under Zeltner's leadership, Switzerland developed in 1991 a pioneering illicit drug policy, which has received global attention. It is based on a 4-pillar strategy (prevention, harm reduction, therapy, and law enforcement), which is enshrined in the Swiss law on narcotic drugs. The harm reduction policy of Switzerland – which includes large-scale syringe exchange programs (also in prisons) and the medical prescription of heroin for chronic heroin addicts – was introduced against the strong opposition of the UN drug control authorities, but endorsed by a majority of the Swiss population in several popular referendums. As director of the Swiss Federal Office of Public Health, he presided over changes to transform the regulated market model of the Swiss health care sector into a more value- and consumer-driven health care system. The Swiss model guarantees access to affordable insurance to all, even if they have pre-existing medical problems. All residents are required to buy insurance even if they are currently healthy, so that the risk pool remains reasonably favorable. Finally subsidies are given to low income families to pay for their premiums. Even though the Swiss pay 11.8% of the GDP for health (data 2024), a majority of 63% considers that the system works well or very well (data 2023).

In 1999–2000, at the request of the then-Director General of WHO, Gro Harlem Brundtland, Zeltner chaired a committee which investigated the efforts of multinational tobacco companies to undermine tobacco control activities of the World Health Organization (2000). This landmark report marks the beginning of the development of the WHO Framework Convention on Tobacco Control (2003). With his efforts to reduce tobacco consumption in Switzerland, Zeltner became a favorite adversary of big tobacco and was nicknamed “the Tobacco Taliban.". Zeltner was a member and vice-president of the executive board of the World Health Organization (WHO) (1999-2002). He chaired the committee to reform the governance rules of the WHO in 2002–4. He was also Executive President of the WHO Regional Committee for Europe (1994–95) and Chairman of the Governing Council of the International Agency for Research on Cancer, (1998-2000). Between 2012 and 2014, Zeltner served the World Health Organization (WHO) in the capacity of a Special Envoy.

In this function he advised the Director General of WHO, Margaret Chan, in critical areas of the ongoing reform of this UN agency. The work was successfully completed by adoption of the Framework of Engagement with Non-State Actors (FENSA) by the World Health Assembly in May 2016

== Current position ==
In 2020, the World Health Organization (WHO) announced that Zeltner was one of the founding board members and the first chairman of the WHO Foundation, an independent grant-making foundation focused on addressing the most pressing global health challenges of today and tomorrow.

Since 1992, he has been Professor of Public Health at the University of Bern. Since 2018 he also serves as a member of the Board of the Medical University of Vienna (Austria).

In 2023 he was elected as president of Swiss Red Cross.
