= Heinrich Federer =

Swiss Catholic priest and writer

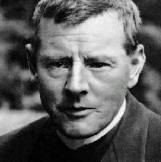
- Born: 6 October 1866; Brienz, Canton of Bern; Switzerland
- Died: 29 April 1928 (aged 61); Zürich, Switzerland
- Resting place: Rehalp cemetery
- Occupations: Catholic priest, novelist, poet, memoirist
- Relatives: Federer family

Heinrich Federer (6 October 1866 – 29 April 1928) was a Swiss writer and Catholic priest.

== Biography ==
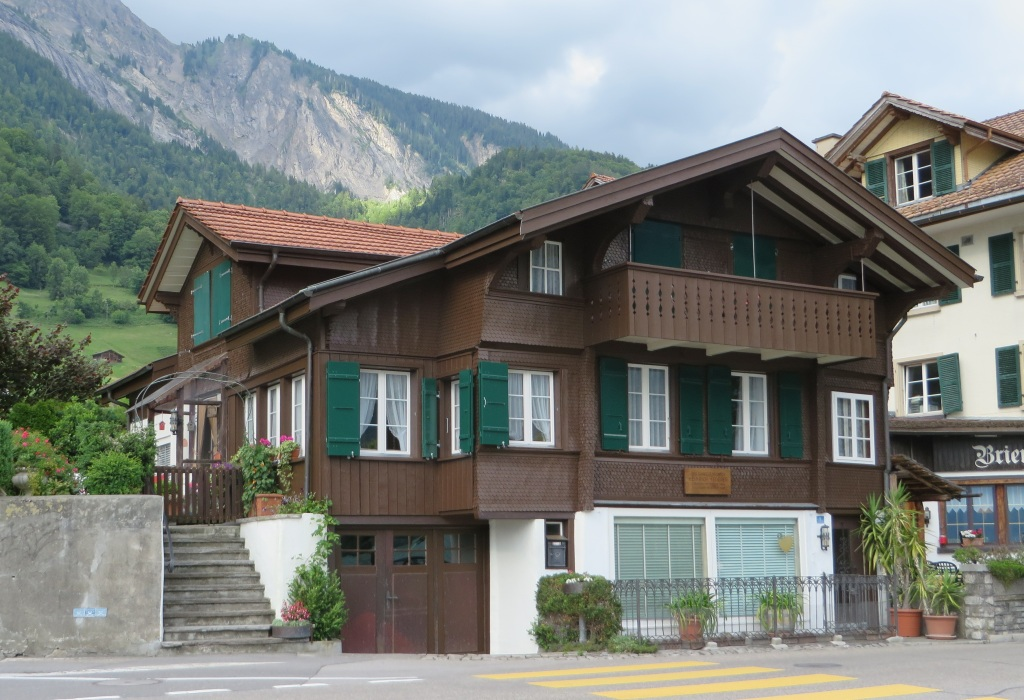
Federer's birthplace in Brienz

Federer was born on 6 October 1866 in the Bernese village of Brienz. His father, Johann Paul Federer, was a wood carver and school teacher whose family came from Berneck, St. Gallen. He attended grammar school in Sarnen from 1881 until 1887, when he went to study at a college in Schwyz. After studying Catholic theology in Eichstätt, Lucerne, and Freiburg, he was ordained as a Catholic priest in 1893 and assigned as the chaplain in Jonschwil. He retired from the priesthood in 1899 after suffering from ill health. After an asthma diagnosis in 1900, he was transferred to a women's home in Zürich to recover. While there, he worked as the editor-in-chief of the Neue Zürcher Nachrichten, a Catholic newspaper.

Federer had requested residence at Einsiedeln Abbey but was denied admission due to rumors of inappropriate sexual behavior. On 24 September 1902, Federer was accused of eliciting an abusive sexual relationship with a twelve year old pupil, Emil Brunner.

Federer wrote as a novelist, poet, and memoirist. Many of his books had religious themes, and countered the nationalistic Heimatkunst movement in Switzerland. In the 20th century he was a best-selling author and awarded multiple literary accolades, including the Gottfried-Keller-Preis in 1925.

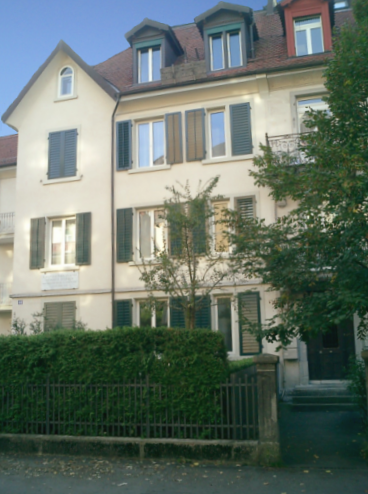
Federer's last residence in Zürich

Federer died on 29 April 1928 and is buried in the Rehalp cemetery in Zürich. His literary works are preserved in the Swiss Literary Archives in Bern.

In 1966 Federer was honored with a Swiss federal stamp.

== Bibliography ==
- Berge und Menschen, Roman, 1911
- Lachweiler Geschichten, stories, 1911
- Pilatus, narration, 1912
- Sisto e Sesto, narration, 1913
- Jungfer Therese, Roman, 1913
- Das letzte Stündlein des Papstes, Narration, 1914
- Das Mätteliseppi, Roman, 1916
- Unser Herrgott und der Schweizer. Ein stolzbescheidenes Geschichtlein, 1916
- Patria, narration, 1916
- Eine Nacht in den Abruzzen. Mein Tarcisius-Geschichtlein, 1917
- Gebt mir meine Wildnis wieder, narrative, 1918
- Der Fürchtemacher, Narration, 1919
- Das Wunder in Holzschuhen, stories, 1919
- Spitzbube über Spitzbube, narrative, 1921
- Papst und Kaiser im Dorf, narration, 1924
- Wander- und Wundergeschichten aus dem Süden, stories, 1924
- Regina Lob, Roman, 1925
- Unter südlichen Sonnen und Menschen, six short stories, 1926
- Am Fenster, autobiography, 1927
- Aus jungen Tagen, autobiography, 1928
- Von Heiligen, Räubern und von der Gerechtigkeit, 1929
- Ich lösche das Licht, poems, 1930
