= Ida Glanzmann-Hunkeler =

Swiss politician (born 1958)

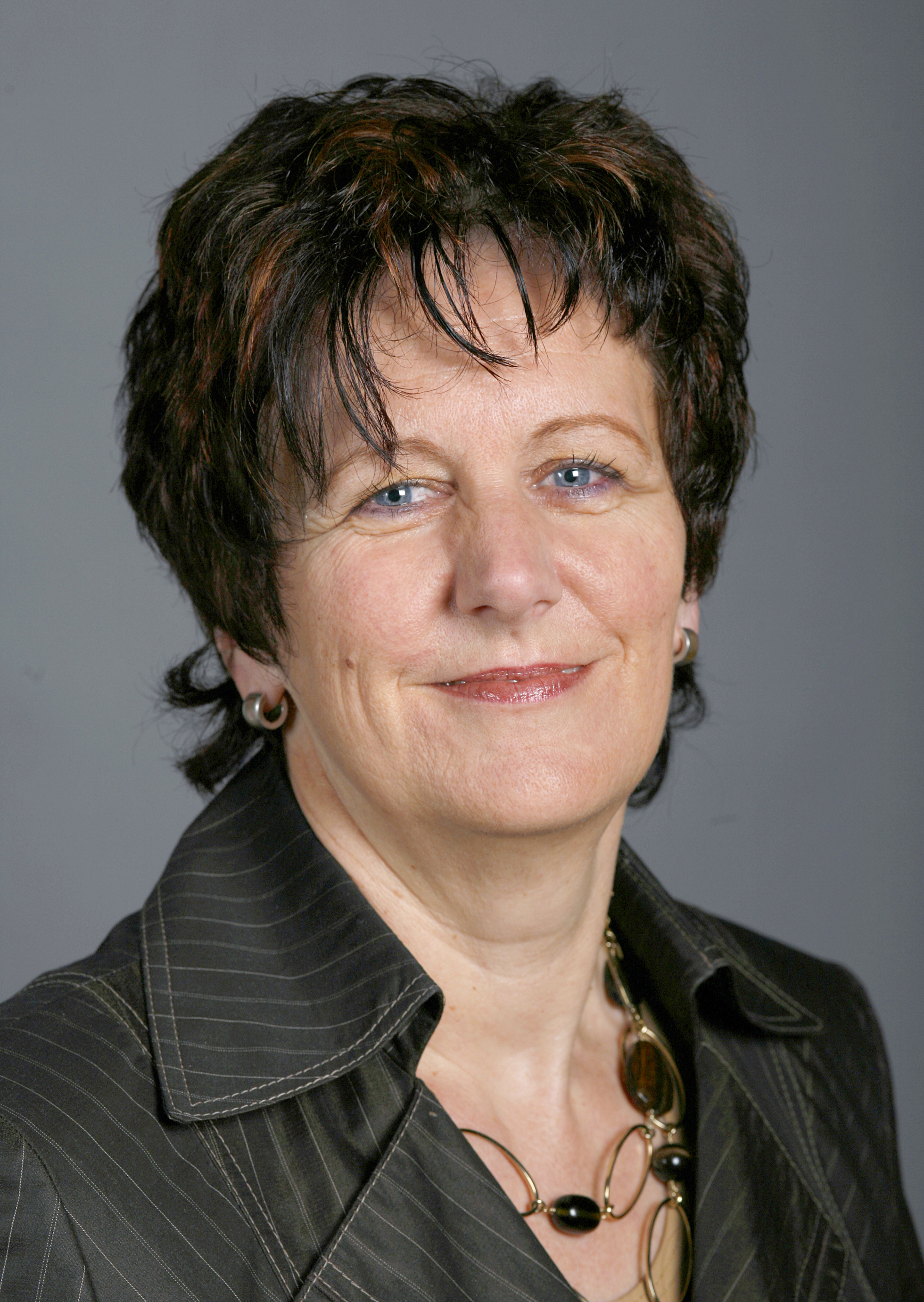
- Glanzmann-Hunkeler in 2007

Personal details
- Born: 29 September 1958 (age 66); Zofingen, Switzerland
- Political party: Christian Democratic People's; Party

Ida Glanzmann (born 29 September 1958) is a Swiss politician and the President of The Centre 60+.

From 1995 to 2006, she was a grand councilor in the legislature of the canton of Lucerne. Between 1997 and 2004, she was vice-president of Christian Democratic People's Party (CVP) in the canton of Lucerne. From 2001 to 2009, she chaired the CVP Women Switzerland. From 2011 to 2021, she served as the Vice President of CVP Switzerland, when the party merged into The Centre. Since 2021, she has been the President of The Centre 60+. She was elected to the National Council on 18 September 2006. She is a member of 14 different Parliamentary groups.

== Personal life ==
She grew up and still lives in Altishofen. She has three children.
