= Einsiedeln Abbey =

Benedictine monastery in Switzerland

Coordinates: 47°07′36″N 08°45′5.3″E

- Kloster Einsiedeln
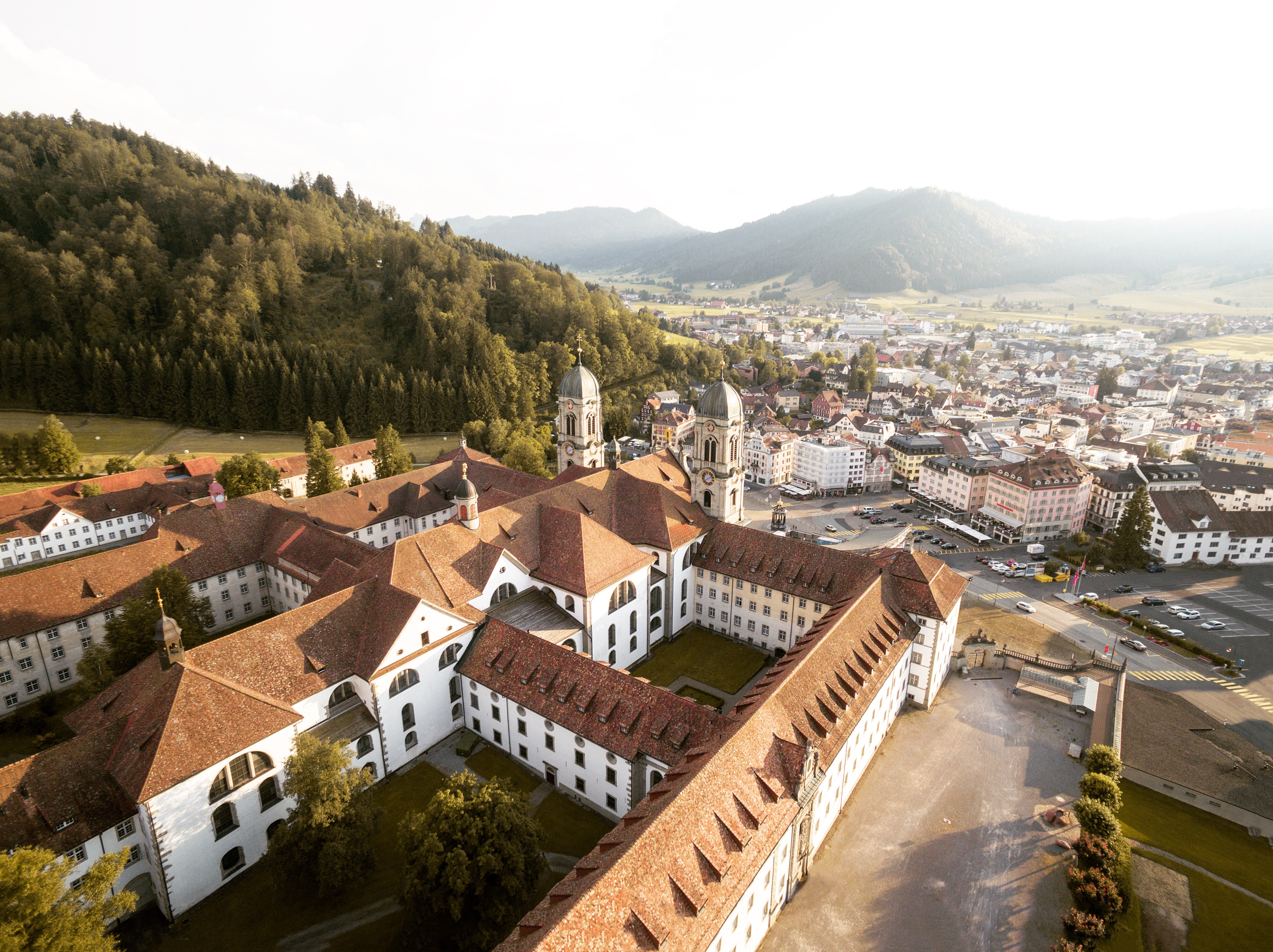

- Location within Canton of Schwyz Location within Switzerland

Monastery information
- Order: Order of Saint Benedict
- Established: 934
- Dedication: Our Lady of the Hermits
- Diocese: Einsiedeln territorial abbey

People
- Founder: Eberhard of Strasbourg
- Abbot: Urban Federer O.S.B.
- Prior: Daniel Emmenegger O.S.B.
- Important associated figures: Saint Meinrad

Architecture
- Style: Baroque (1704/1735)

Site
- Location: Einsiedeln, Canton of Schwyz, Switzerland
- Public access: allowed
- Other information: place of pilgrimage, gymnasium (Swiss Matura, 400 students), work shops, plant nursery, viniculture, stud
- Website: https://www.kloster-einsiedeln.ch

Einsiedeln Abbey (German: Kloster Einsiedeln) is a Catholic monastery administered by the Benedictine Order in the village of Einsiedeln, Switzerland.

The Abbey of Einsiedeln is one of the most important baroque monastic sites and the largest place of pilgrimage in Switzerland.

The Black Madonna of Einsiedeln in the Chapel of Grace attracts around 800,000 pilgrims and tourists every year. The community of Benedictine monks has around 40 members. The monastery is not under the jurisdiction of a diocese or a bishop because it is a territorial abbey.

The abbey operates a private high school along with a winery, sawmill, restaurant and other small businesses in order to support itself. One of the high school students, Ludwig von Flüe, later made a career in the Swiss Guards in France. He played a key role in the Storming of the Bastille during the French Revolution.

== History ==
=== Origin of the monastery ===
The history of Einsiedeln Abbey starts with Meinrad of Einsiedeln. Born in 797 in Sulchen, he was educated at the abbey school on Reichenau Island in what is today Germany. Meinrad became a monk and was later ordained a priest. After gaining public attention for reportedly performing miracles, Meinrad established a hermitage in 828 in the Einsiedeln forest of Switzerland, searching for privacy. He was murdered by two robbers in January 861.

Over the next 80 years, other hermits occupied Meinrad's hermitage. In 934 Eberhard, previously Provost of Strassburg, built the Einsiedeln abbey and church on the hermitage site, becoming its first abbot. According to legend, the church was consecrated in 948 in person by Jesus Christ in honor of his mother Mary. It was the beginning of the pilgrimage to the Chapel of the Saviour, which turned in the Middle Ages to a Marian pilgrimage.

In 965 Gregory, the third Abbot of Einsiedeln, was named a prince of the Holy Roman Empire by Emperor Otto I. His successor abbots would hold that title until the dissolution of the empire in 1806.

=== High and late Middle Ages ===
In 1226, after another fire, the church was enlarged. The lower church was built above the Chapel of the Saviour, which was incorporated into the new complex. This effect, of a sanctuary within a sanctuary, has been maintained in later restorations of the Chapel of Our Lady.

In the 13th century, the pilgrimage to the monastic compley became more popular, better structured and organized. The figure of the enthroned Madonna holding the baby Christ on her left knee, which appears on an abbey seal from 1239, is considered Einsiedeln's oldest miraculous image.

=== Early modern times ===
During the early 16th century, the standards of discipline at Einsiedeln started to decline, but Ludovicus II, a monk of St. Gall who was Abbot of Einsiedeln from 1526 to 1544, restored a stricter observance. The abbey remained unaffected by the Protestant Reformation in Switzerland. Its leader, Huldrych Zwingli, had studied at the abbey for a period of time. Abbot Augustine I (1600–29) led the movement to create the Swiss Congregation of the Order of St. Benedict in 1602. Augustine established unrelaxed observance in the abbey and promoted a high standard of scholarship and learning amongst his monks.

The Einsiedeln abbey church was rebuilt by Abbot Maurus between 1704 and 1719 and the baroque ornamentation was completed in 1734. In 1798, the abbey was occupied by French revolution soldiers, losing its status as an independent principality. The clergy could return to the monastery in 1801. On February 19, 1803, the abbey was officially reinstalled by the Act of Mediation. However, the Chapel of Grace was only rebuilt in 1815-1817 with the remaining parts of the old structure in the neoclassical style.

=== 19th and 20th century ===
Because of the political uncertainties inside and outside the country in the 1840s, the Einsiedeln leadership became afraid that the abbey would be suppressed or dissolved. They sent a group of monks to southern Indiana in the United States to minister to German immigrants and develop a possible place of refuge. The monks started a new foundation, now Saint Meinrad Archabbey in St. Meinrad, Indiana.

There are a total of five monasteries in the USA that are linked to Einsiedeln by history:

- Saint Meinrad Archabbey in St. Meinrad, Indiana
- Subiaco Abbey in Logan County, Arkansas
- St. Joseph Abbey in Saint Benedict, Louisiana
- Marmion Abbey in Aurora, Illinois
- Prince of Peace Abbey in Oceanside, California

A highlight in the history of the monastery was the visit of Pope John Paul II in the summer of 1984, who solemnly consecrated the new high altar in the lower choir on June 15.

== Marian veneration ==
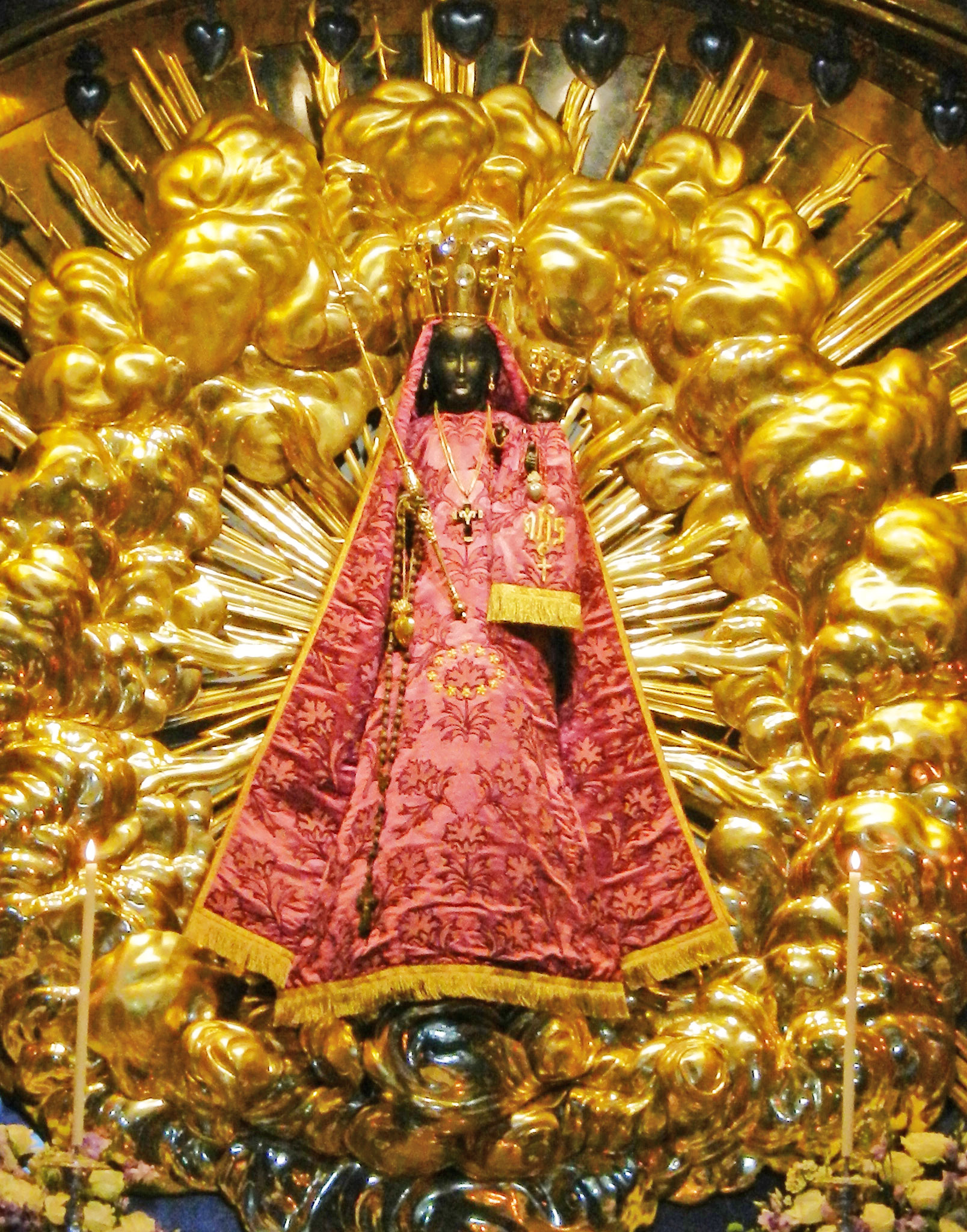
The canonically crowned image of Our Lady of Hermits.

In contrast to for example Lourdes, the pilgrimage in Einsiedeln does not go back to a Marian apparition, but to a monastic tradition.

The oldest surviving reference to the Einsiedeln pilgrimage dates back to the early 14th century. However, the pilgrimage itself is likely to be older. It was encouraged by the legend of the consecration of the angels, according to which the Einsiedeln Chapel of Grace was consecrated by Christ himself in 948. Originally, the Einsiedeln pilgrimage was therefore a pilgrimage to the church consecrated by Christ, which only gradually became a Marian pilgrimage with the rise of Marian devotion in the High Middle Ages. The miraculous consecration is commemorated every year on the Feast of the Consecration of the Angels on September 14.

The Middle Ages were the great age of pilgrimages. In addition to pilgrimages to Einsiedeln, many were also passing through on their way to Rome or Santiago de Compostela.

After the Reformation and especially in the Baroque period, Einsiedeln became more and more of a Marian pilgrimage site. After the great ecclesiastical crisis caused by the Reformation, the monastic community consolidated again and played a significant role in shaping Einsiedeln's pilgrimage culture.

Nowadays, the monastery is visited by hundreds of thousands of pilgrims from all over the world every year. The majority come from Switzerland and the surrounding countries, but pilgrims from Eastern and Central European countries are also well represented. In addition to the traditional religious pilgrims, there are also more and more visitors who come to the monastery and village for cultural reasons.

== Bells ==
The Einsiedeln Abbey has twelve bells in total. The quarter hours are struck by two separate striking bells, while the hours are struck by the 2 largest swinging bells. Only 8 of the 12 bells are use for pealing; the largest bell or bourdon hangs separately in the south tower of the main facade, while the other seven hang in the North Tower. The largest bell is called the Trinity Bell, it hangs in the south tower and weighs approximately 5.9 tons. In Switzerland, the bells are always numbered from largest to smallest, Bell 1 is always the tenor or bourdon.

The bourdon is one of the largest bells in Switzerland made by the bell founders of Lorraine. Besides its interaction with the other bells in many different partial pcalledand in the full peal, the bell is also very often heard solo:

- On most major feast days for the consecration and the Angelus at noon and in the evening
- During the summer bell-ringing schedule (Easter-All Saints' Day), every Friday at noon in remembrance of Jesus' crucifixion
- On Ash Wednesday at midnight to mark the beginning of Lent
- The tolling of the bell at the death of a monk serves as a final signal.

Bell	Bell Name (German)	Bell Name (English)	Foundry	Casting year
1	Dreifaltigkeitsglocke	Trinity Bell (Bourdon)	Simon Michelin, Honoré Rosier, Lorraine	1637
2	Liebfrauenglocke	Our Lady Bell	H. Rosier, F. Guiot, J. Reichardus, Lorraine	1636
3	Apostelglocke	Apostles' Bell	Honoré Rosier, Lorraine	1637
4	St.-Agatha-Glocke	St. Agatha's Bell	H. Rüetschi AG, Aarau	1941
5	Allerheiligenglocke	All Saints' Day bell	H. Rüetschi AG, Aarau	1941
6	St.-Benedikts-und-Meinradsglocke (Salveglocke)	St. Benedict and Meinrad Bell (Salve Bell)	H. Rüetschi AG, Aarau	1941
7	Schutzengel Glocke	Guardian Angel Bell	H. Rüetschi AG, Aarau	1941
8	Kleine Salbenglocke	Small Salve bell	Honoré Rosier, Lorraine	1637

== Status today ==
=== Community ===
The Einsiedeln monastic community currently consists of 40 monks (as of October 2023). The average age (as well as the median) is comparatively low at just under 60 years due to the continuous arrival of new members in recent years.

Einsiedeln is still a territorial abbey, meaning that it is located in a territory that is not part of any diocese which the abbot governs "as its proper pastor" (Canon 370, Codex Juris Canonici) with the same authority as a diocesan bishop.

The head of the community has been Abbot Urban Federer since December 2013. As Abbot of Einsiedeln, he is a full member of the Swiss Bishops' Conference.

Located in separate cantons, Einsiedeln Abbey and Fahr Convent, a community of Benedictine nuns, form a double monastery, both under the authority of the male Abbot of Einsiedeln.

=== Library ===
The monastery's library is rich in old books: it contains around 230,000 printed books, 1230 manuscripts and 1040 volumes of incunabula and early printed books. Between 500 and 800 books are added every year.

The library was founded in 934 and the monastery already had its own writing school in the mid-10th century; 64 manuscripts from this period are still preserved today. The scriptorium, established in 2022, is a reminder of this, where visitors can learn about the production of books in the Middle Ages and write with ink and quill themselves. The monastery was given its own printing press in 1664, where over a thousand titles were published by 1798. The library was last restored in 1998.

=== School ===
Einsiedeln Abbey School is a private and federally recognized Matura school in Einsiedeln with a history stretching back over 1,000 years. It is organized by the Benedictine monastery of Einsiedeln. Around 400 students attend the school, which is taught by around 50 teachers. Among them are also five priests.

The mission statement of the Abbey School is shaped by the Benedictine tradition. According to the current abbot of Einsiedeln Abbey, this is reflected in "the most holistic humanistic education possible, which essentially includes the artistic dimension". The abbey school is thus intended to offer an alternative to the existing range of schools.

== List of abbots ==
The following list is drawn from the Einsiedeln website.

Abbot of Einsiedeln
Name	from	until
Eberhard	934	958
Thietland	958	964
Gregory	964	996
Wirunt	996	1026
Embrich	1026	1051
Hermann I	1051	1065
Henry I	1065	1070
Seliger von Wolhusen	1070	1090
Rudolf I	1090	1101
Gero	1101	1122
Wernher I	1122	1142
Rudolf II	1142	1171
Wernher II	1173	1192
Ulrich I	1192	1206
Bertold von Waldsee	1206	1213
Konrad I	1213	1233
Anselm von Schwanden	1233	1266
Ulrich II	1267	1277
Peter I	1277	1280
Heinrich II von Güttingen	1280	1299
Johannes I von Schwanden	1299	1327
Johannes II von Hasenburg	1327	1334
Konrad II von Gösgen	1334	1348
Heinrich III von Brandis	1348	1357
Nikolaus I von Gutenburg	1357	1364
Markwart VII von Grünenberg	1364	1376
Peter II von Wolhusen	1376	1386
Ludwig I von Thierstein	1387	1402
Hugo von Rosenegg	1402	1418
Burkard von Krenkingen-Weissenburg	1418	1438
Rudolf III. von Hohensax	1438	1447
Franz von Hohenrechberg	1447	1452
Gerold von Hohensax	1452	1480
Konrad III von Hohenrechberg	1480	1526
Ludwig II Blarer	1526	1544
Joachim Eichhorn	1544	1569
Adam Heer von Rapperswil	1569	1585
Ulrich III Wittwiler von Rorschach	1585	1600
Augustin I Hofmann	1600	1629
Plazidus Reimann	1629	1670
Augustin II Reding	1670	1692
Raphael Gottrau	1692	1698
Maurus von Roll	1698	1714
Thomas I Schenklin	1714	1734
Nikolaus II Imfeld	1734	1773
Marian Müller	1773	1780
Beat Küttel	1780	1808
Konrad IV Tanner	1808	1825
Cölestin Müller	1825	1846
Heinrich IV Schmid	1846	1874
Basilius Oberholzer	1875	1895
Columban Brugger	1895	1905
Thomas Bossart	1905	1923
Ignatius Staub	1923	1947
Benno Gut	1947	1959
Raymund Tschudi	1959	1969
Georg Holzherr	1969	2001
Martin Werlen	2001	2013
Urban Federer	2013	

== Transport ==
The abbey is within walking distance to Einsiedeln railway station, served by the S13 (to Wädenswil) and S40 (to Rapperswil) services of Zurich S-Bahn. Both these services call at Biberbrugg, where connections to Lucerne exist.

== Gallery ==
Front der Klosterkirche (2026)

Kloster mit Vorplatz

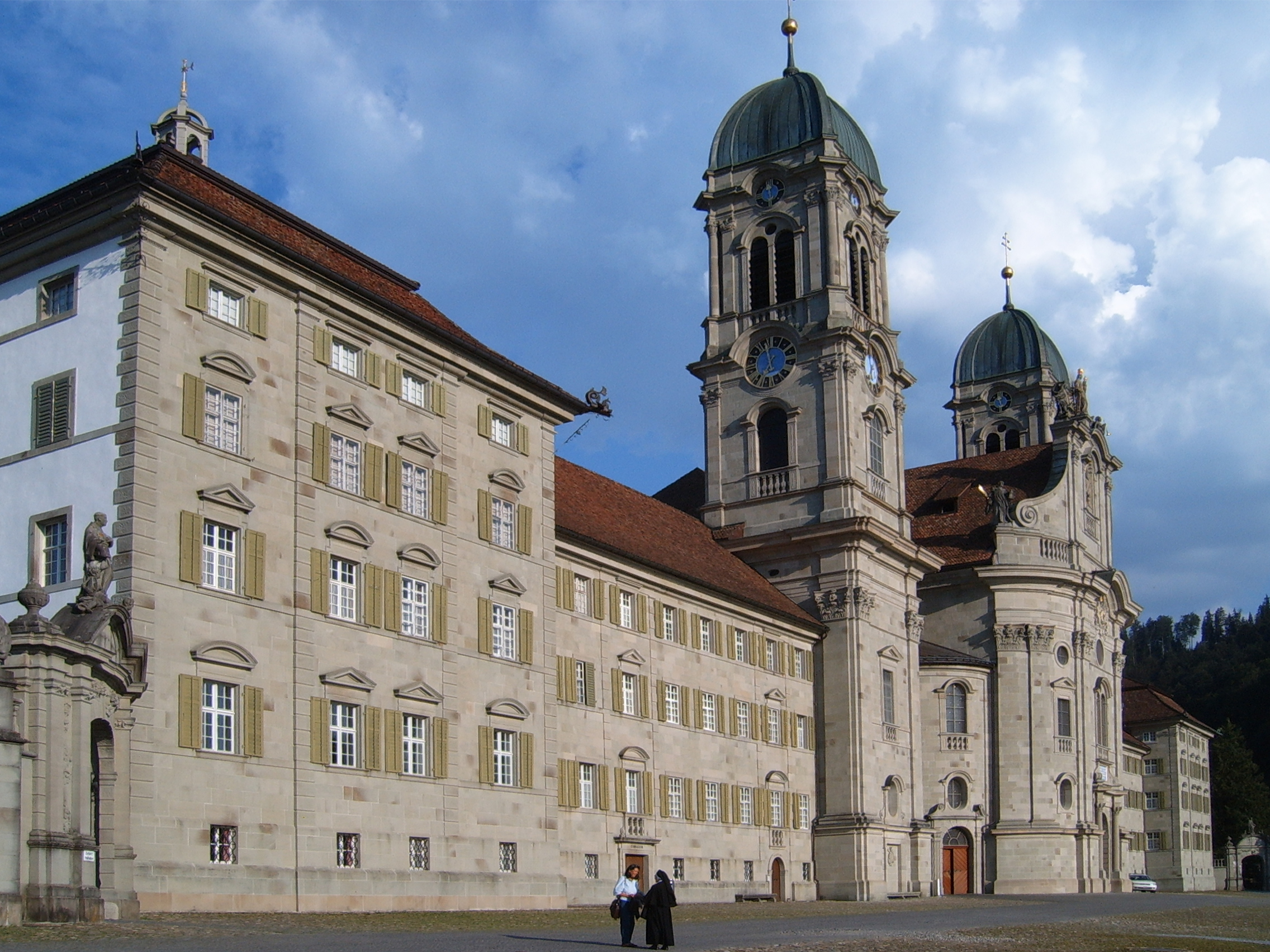
The abbey as seen from the left

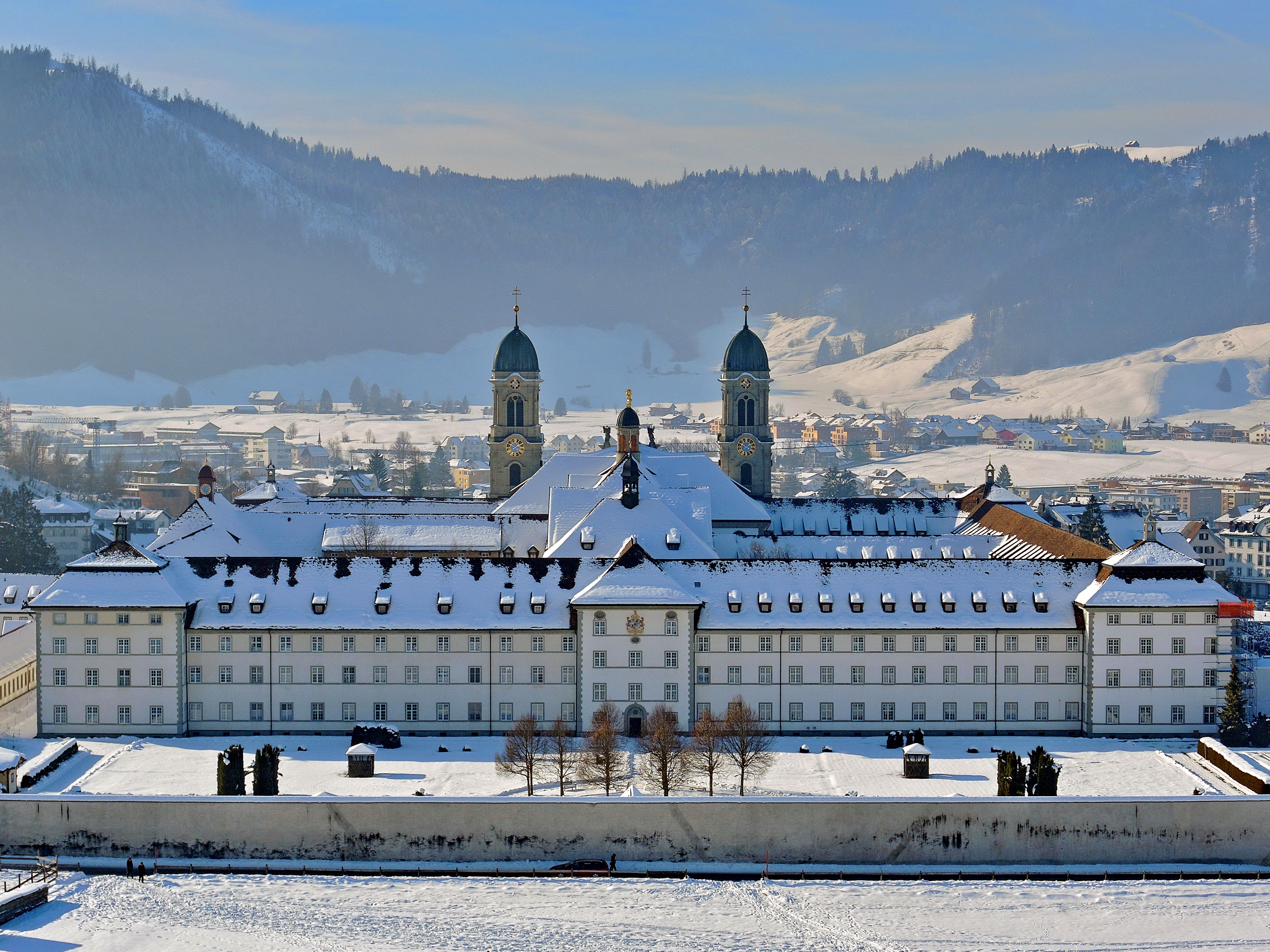
The abbey as seen from the east

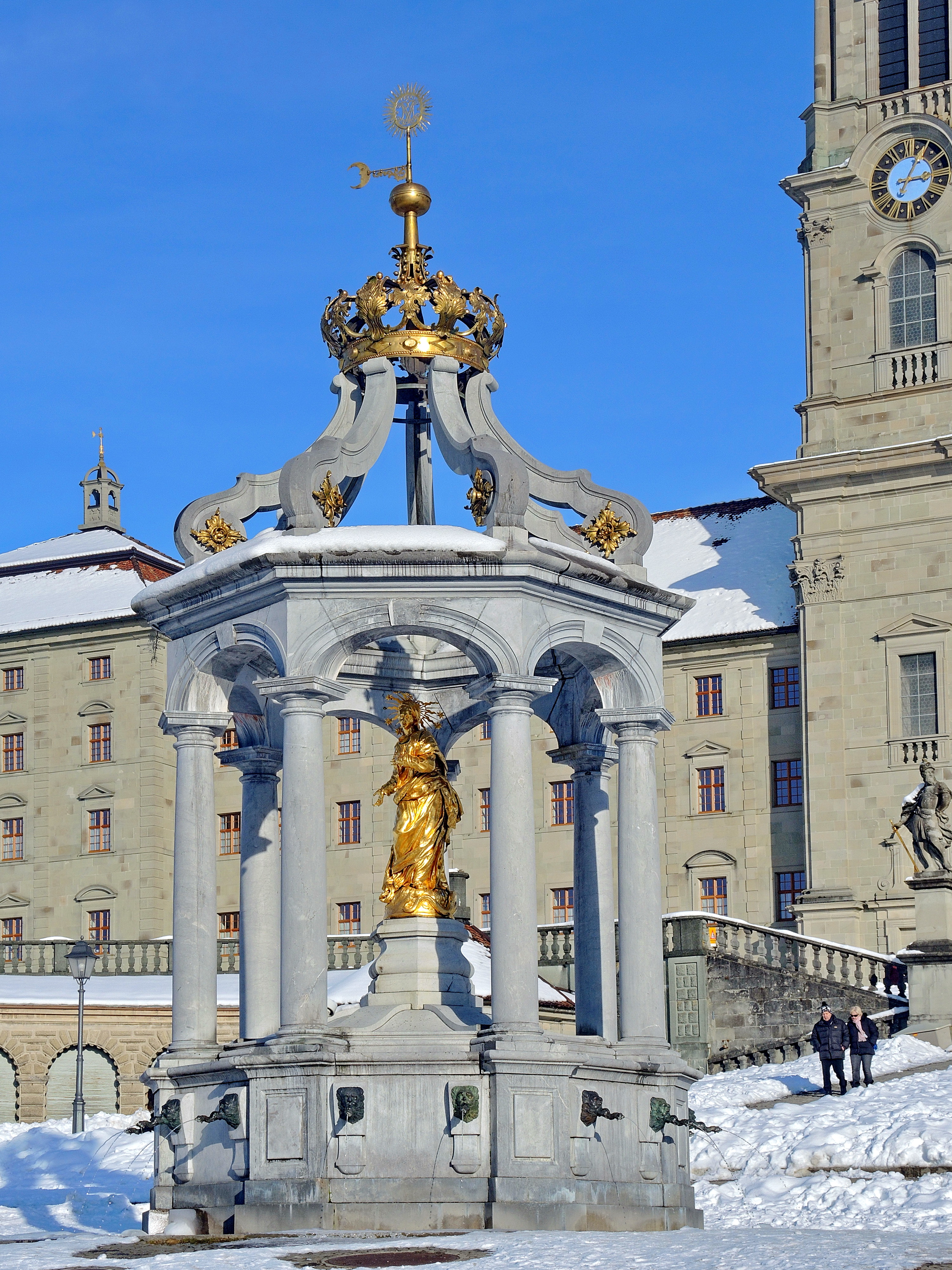
Lady Fountain

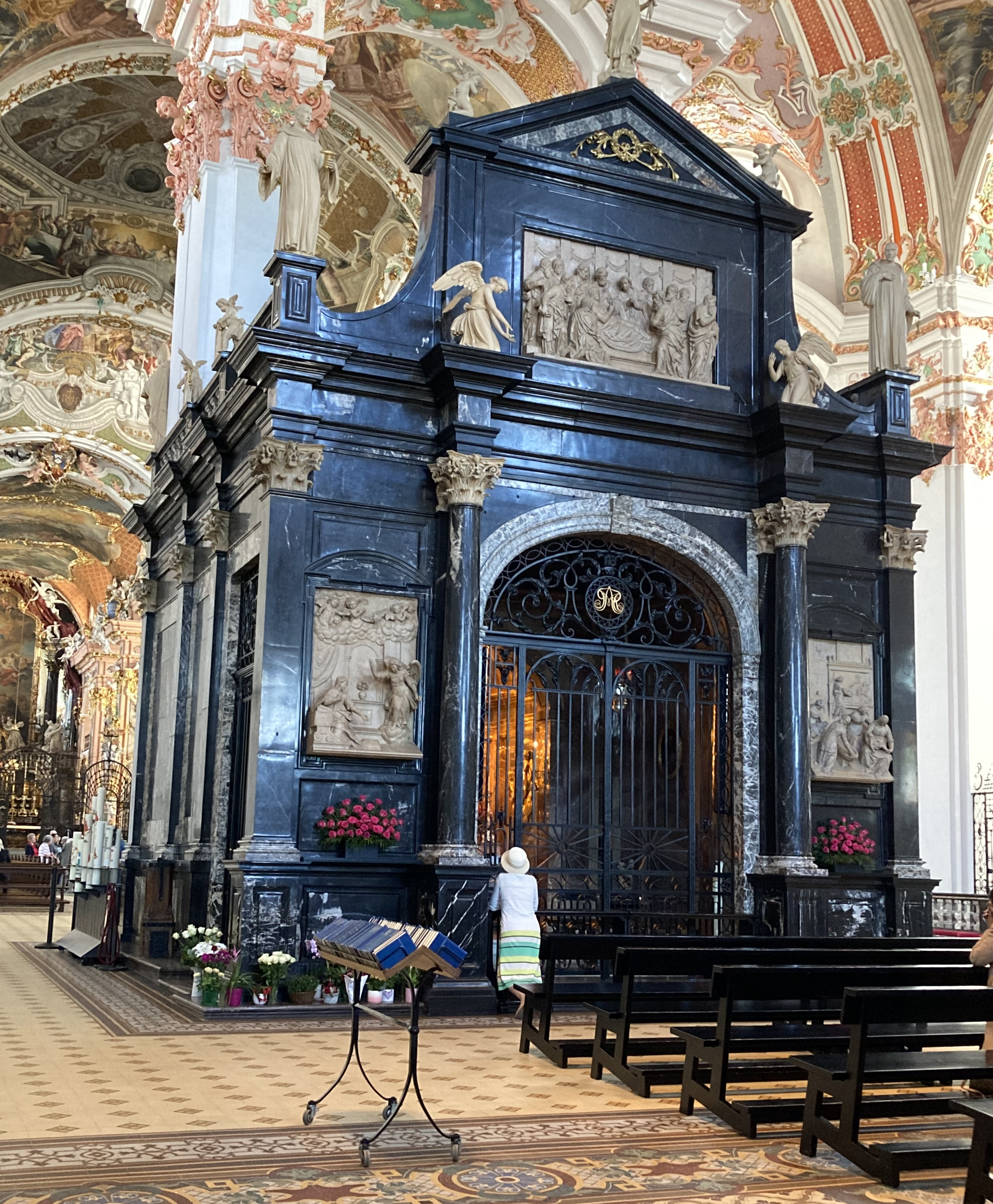
Einsiedeln, the Lady chapel (interior)

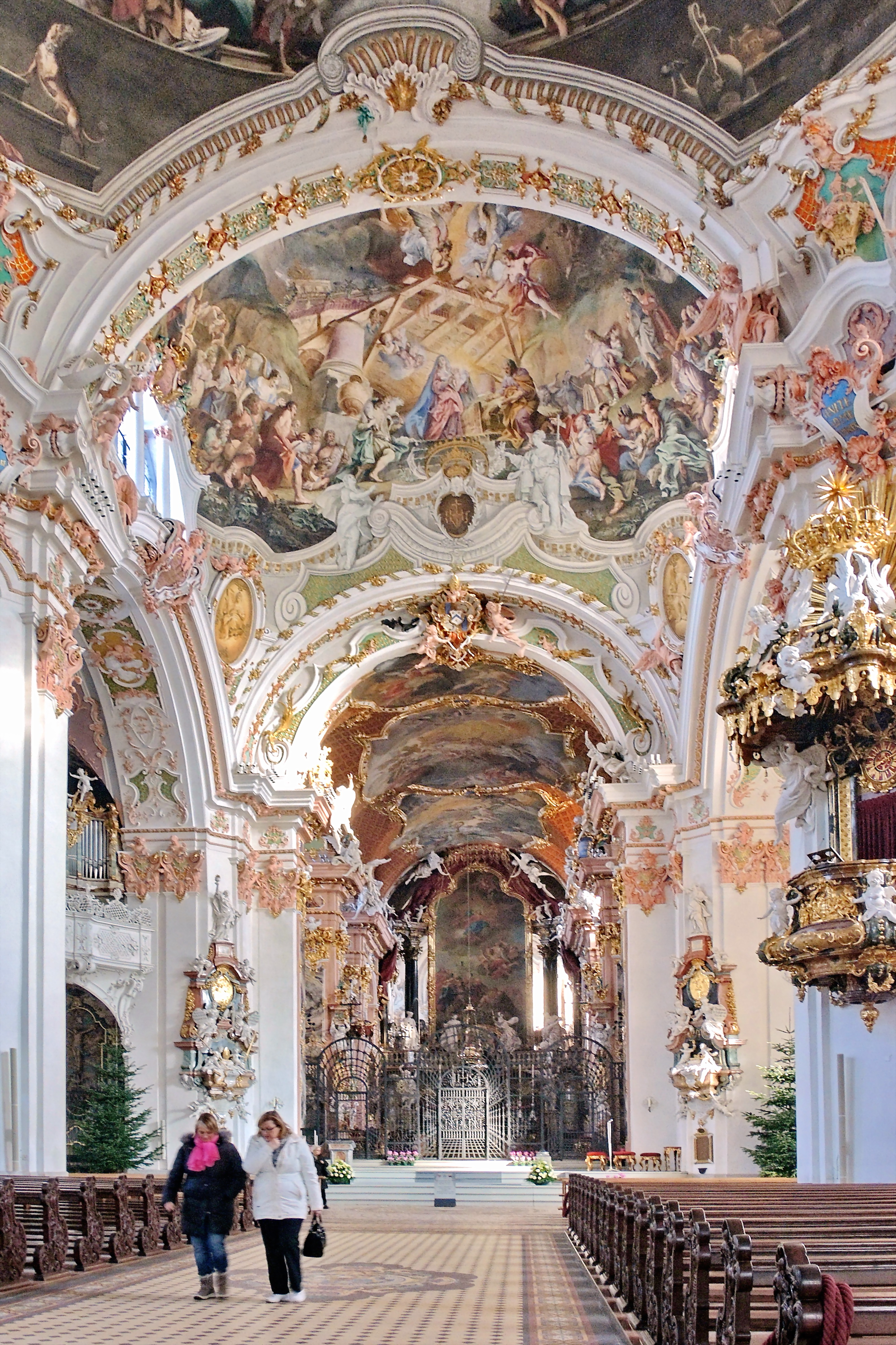
Nave of the abbey church

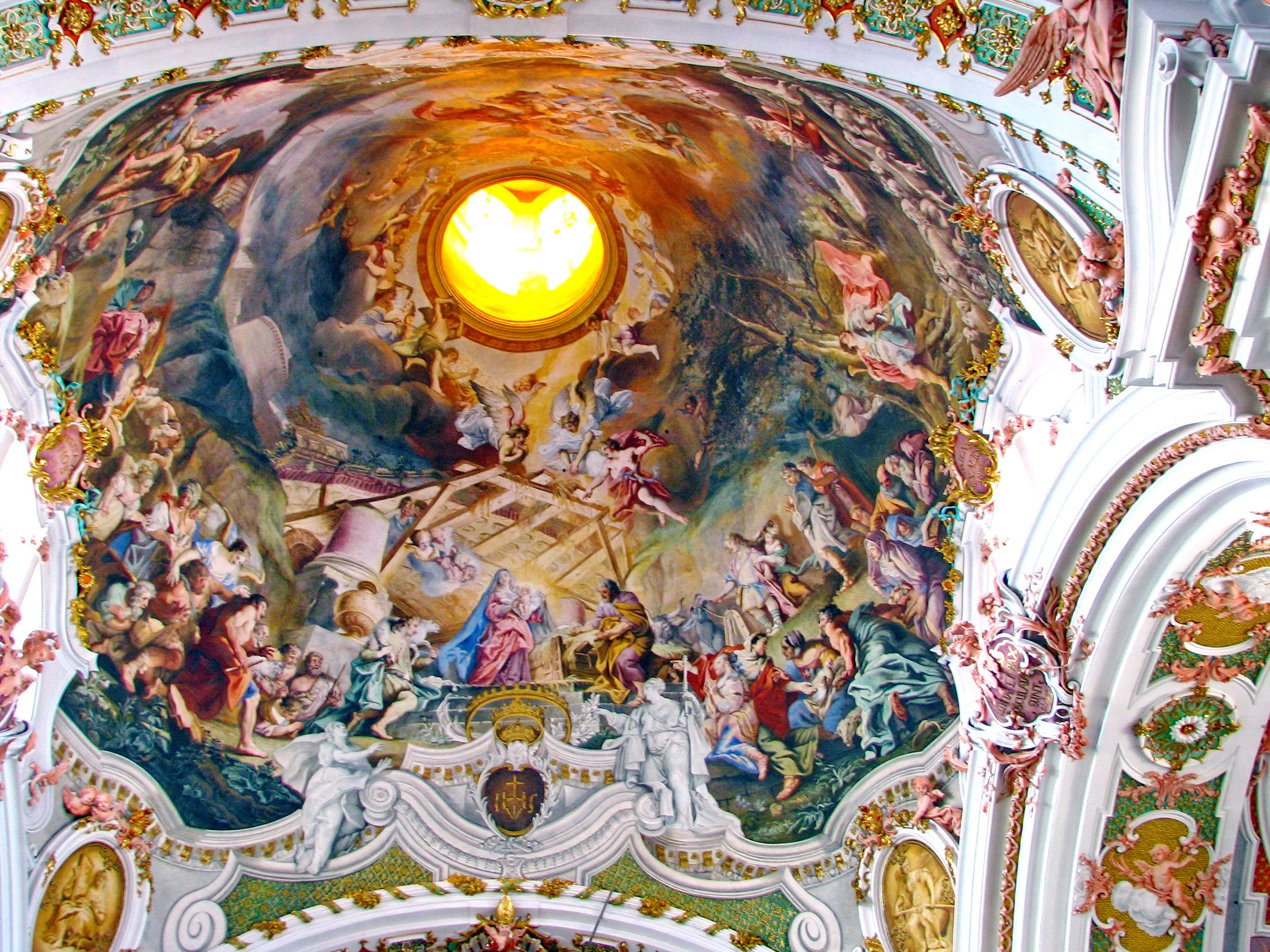
Details of the ceiling paintings

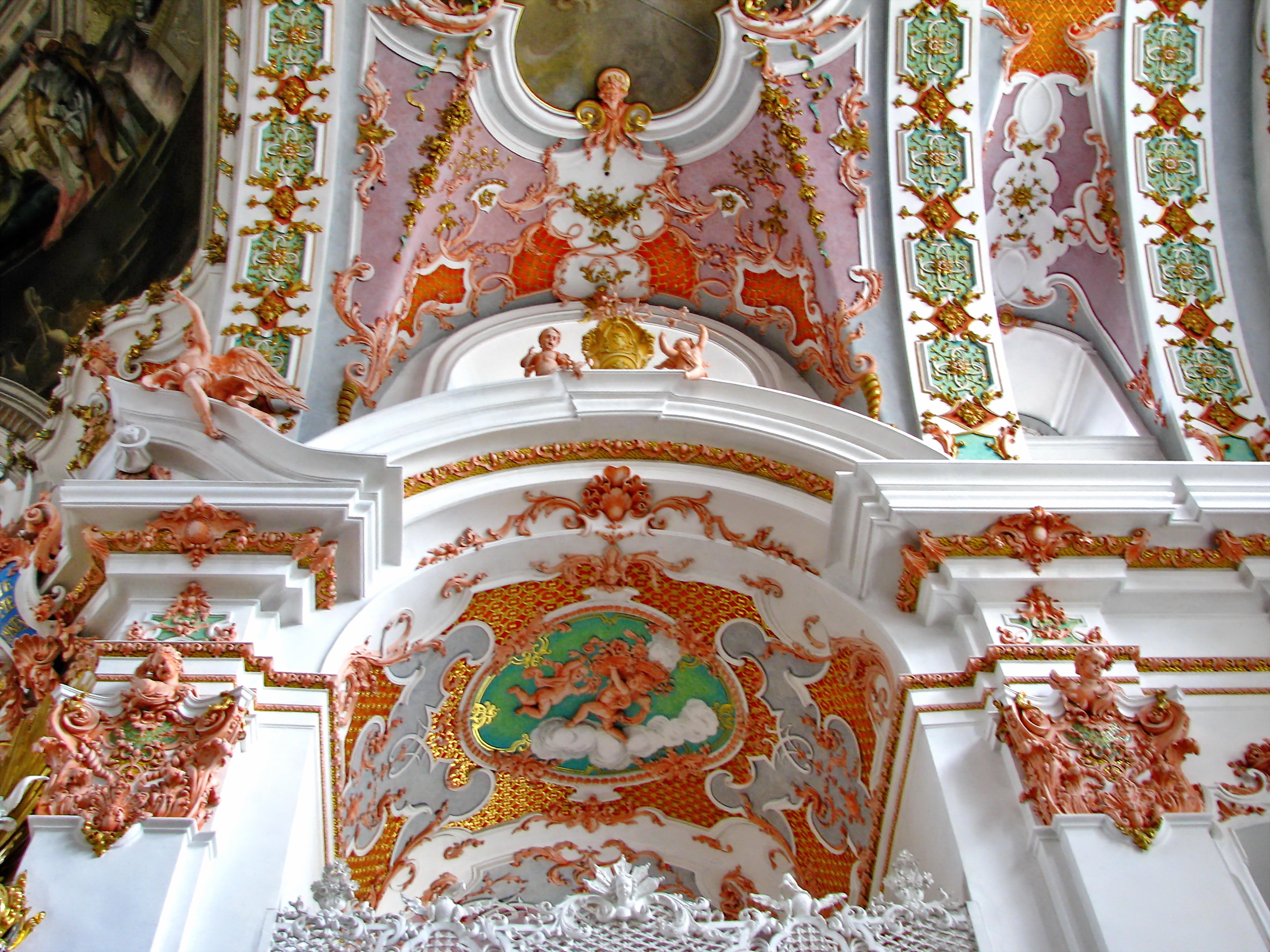
Details of the ceiling paintings

== Bibliography ==
- Moreau (Odile et Richard): D'Einsiedeln à la Salette au fil des siècles : avec les pėlerins comtois sur les pas de la Vierge Marie. L'Harmattan, Paris, 2012.

== See also ==
- Meinrad of Einsiedeln
- Gall Morel
- Johann Michael Feuchtmayer the Elder, Franz Joseph Feuchtmayer
- Martin Marty (bishop)
