= Tuenno =

- Comune
- Comune di Tuenno
- Location within Italy Location within Trentino-Alto Adige/Südtirol
- Coordinates: 46°20′N 11°1′E
- Country: Italy
- Region: Trentino-Alto Adige/Südtirol
- Province: Trentino (TN)

Government
  - Mayor: Pietro Leonardi

Area
  - Total: 70.7 km^{2} (27.3 sq mi)
- Elevation: 630 m (2,070 ft)

Population (Dec. 2004)
  - Total: 2,291
  - Density: 32.4/km^{2} (83.9/sq mi)
- Demonym: Tuennesi
- Time zone: UTC+1 (CET)
  - Summer (DST): UTC+2 (CEST)
- Postal code: 38019
- Dialing code: 0463
- Website: Official website

Tuenno (Nones: Tuèn) was a comune (municipality) in Trentino in the northern Italian region Trentino-Alto Adige/Südtirol, located about 30 kilometres (19 mi) north of Trento. As of 31 December 2004, it had a population of 2,291 and an area of 70.7 square kilometres (27.3 mi^{2}). It was merged with Tassullo and Nanno on January 1, 2016, to form a new municipality, Ville d'Anaunia.

Tuenno borders the following municipalities: Campodenno, Cles, Cunevo, Denno, Dimaro, Flavon, Molveno, Spormaggiore and Terres.

== Interesting sights ==
=== Religious architecture ===
==== St. Emerenziana Church ====
The St. Emerenziana Church is located at the entrance to the Tovel Valley, along the street which brings to the Tovel Lake. The building dates back to the XI-XII century and it is thought it was the house of the friars of Campiglio.

The facades are gabled and on the south side there is a kind of barn. The shovel is original from the 1620s and it was crafted by the master Martino Teofilo Polacco and it represents the Holy Spirit on Maria, Jesus and St. Anna.

Inside the church take place many frescoes which represent St. Emerenziana on her deathbed and a Cazzuffo family crest.

==== St. Orsola Church ====
The St. Orsola Church, parish seat since 1920, was erected in 1914 and it's a single body with the old part of the building. Inside it you can find a wooden altar decorated in gold and inlaid, with a statue from the "Addolorata", another wooden altar of the "Madonna del Rosario" and similar structures even in the new section. The bell tower, built in 1853, leans on foundation held by palafitte.

==== St. Nicolò Church ====
This church was built in memory of St. Nicolò and it has a classical style. It was renovated in 2005.

==== Tovel Church ====
It's a small church, situated in the Tovel Valley, over the lake, more precisely behind the visitors centre. You have to walk through a small path from behind the Lago Rosso Hotel to reach it.

== Society ==
=== Demographic evolution ===
Historical population

Year	Pop.	±%
1861	?	—
1871	?	—
1881	?	—
1901	?	—
1911	?	—

Year	Pop.	±%
1921	2,602	—
1931	1,990	−23.5%
1936	2,063	+3.7%
1951	2,225	+7.9%
1961	2,373	+6.7%

Year	Pop.	±%
1971	2,304	−2.9%
1981	2,227	−3.3%
1991	2,214	−0.6%
2001	2,219	+0.2%

Source: Data from ISTAT

=== Linguistic minorities ===
The traditional language still spoken and understood by the older families of the valley is "nonese, the valley language". In the 2001 census, the 18,84% of the population (418 people) declared to speak "ladino".

== Culture ==
=== Events ===
The most important festivals, which attract the most numbers of local people and tourists are:

- Piazzarolada - annual appointment held every third weekend of July, it includes concerts and gastronomic stands at the historic centre.
- Goldenfest - annual appointment held every third Saturday of October. It's a festival born to celebrate the end of the apple's harvest. "Golden" it's a delicious type of apple which grows in the valley and it gives the name to the festival.
- Apple festival - appointment started in 1985, it's held during the week of the Feast of the Assumption, nearby the Tovel Lake. Here it's possible to taste and try the typical food of the territory, obviously cooked with a main ingredient: the apple.
