= Taio =

- Comune
- Comune di Taio
- Location within Italy Location within Trentino-Alto Adige/Südtirol
- Coordinates: 46°19′N 11°4′E
- Country: Italy
- Region: Trentino-Alto Adige/Südtirol
- Province: Trentino (TN)

Area
  - Total: 11.3 km^{2} (4.4 sq mi)

Population (Dec. 2004)
  - Total: 2,694
  - Density: 238/km^{2} (617/sq mi)
- Time zone: UTC+1 (CET)
  - Summer (DST): UTC+2 (CEST)
- Postal code: 38010
- Dialing code: 0463
- Website: Official website

Taio (Nones: Tai) was a comune (municipality) in Trentino in the northern Italian region Trentino-Alto Adige/Südtirol, located about 30 kilometres (19 mi) north of Trento. As of 31 December 2004, it had a population of 2,694 and an area of 11.3 square kilometres (4.4 mi^{2}). It was merged with Coredo, Smarano, Tres and Vervò on January 1, 2015, to form a new municipality, Predaia.

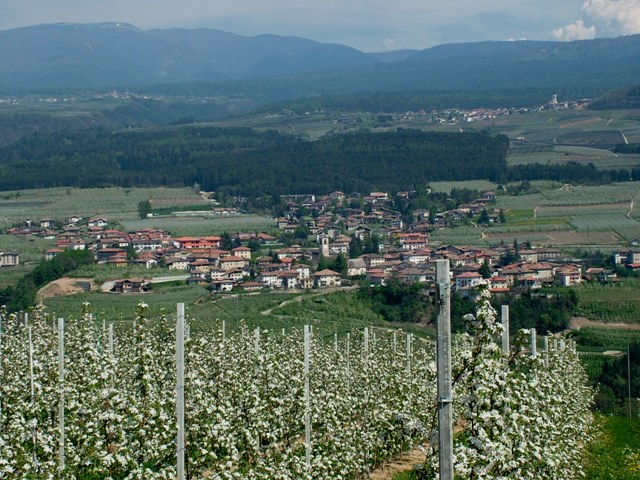

Taio borders the following municipalities: Coredo, Denno, Nanno, Sanzeno, Tassullo, Ton, Tres and Vervò.

Taio included the village of Segno, which is the birthplace of Jesuit missionary Eusebio Kino.

== Demographic evolution ==
Historical population

Year	Pop.	±%
1861	?	—
1871	?	—
1881	?	—
1901	?	—
1911	?	—

Year	Pop.	±%
1921	2,522	—
1931	2,241	−11.1%
1936	2,160	−3.6%
1951	2,346	+8.6%
1961	2,344	−0.1%

Year	Pop.	±%
1971	2,288	−2.4%
1981	2,362	+3.2%
1991	2,363	+0.0%
2001	2,534	+7.2%

Source: Data from ISTAT
