= Nanno =

- Comune
- Comune di Nanno
- Location within Italy Location within Trentino-Alto Adige/Südtirol
- Coordinates: 46°19′N 11°3′E
- Country: Italy
- Region: Trentino-Alto Adige/Südtirol
- Province: Trentino (TN)

Area
  - Total: 4.3 km^{2} (1.7 sq mi)

Population (Dec. 2004)
  - Total: 623
  - Density: 140/km^{2} (380/sq mi)
- Demonym: Nannini
- Time zone: UTC+1 (CET)
  - Summer (DST): UTC+2 (CEST)
- Postal code: 38010
- Dialing code: 0463

Nanno (Nones: Nan) was a comune (municipality) in Trentino in the northern Italian region Trentino-Alto Adige/Südtirol, located about 30 kilometres (19 mi) north of Trento. As of 31 December 2004, it had a population of 623 and an area of 4.3 square kilometres (1.7 mi^{2}). It was merged with Tassullo and Tuenno on January 1, 2016, to form a new municipality, Ville d'Anaunia.

Nanno borders the following municipalities: Tassullo, Tuenno, Terres, Flavon and Denno.

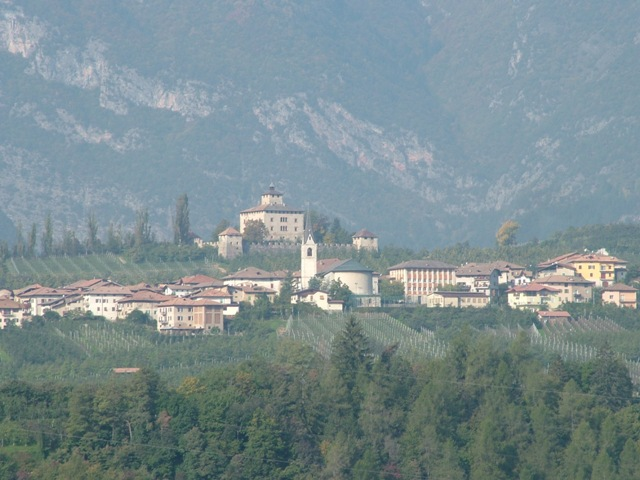
A panoramic view of Nanno

== Demographic evolution ==
Historical population

Year	Pop.	±%
1861	?	—
1871	?	—
1881	?	—
1901	?	—
1911	?	—

Year	Pop.	±%
1921	799	—
1931	683	−14.5%
1936	683	+0.0%
1951	736	+7.8%
1961	715	−2.9%

Year	Pop.	±%
1971	641	−10.3%
1981	617	−3.7%
1991	571	−7.5%
2001	600	+5.1%

Source: Data from ISTAT
