= Sfruz =

- Comune
- Comune di Sfruz
- Coat of arms

- Location within Italy Location within Trentino-Alto Adige/Südtirol
- Coordinates: 46°20′13.85″N 11°6′55.66″E
- Country: Italy
- Region: Trentino-Alto Adige/Südtirol
- Province: Trentino (TN)
- Frazioni: Credai

Government
  - Mayor: Andrea Biasi

Area
  - Total: 11.7 km^{2} (4.5 sq mi)

Population (2018-01-01)
  - Total: 320
  - Density: 27/km^{2} (71/sq mi)
- Demonym: Sfruzzini
- Time zone: UTC+1 (CET)
  - Summer (DST): UTC+2 (CEST)
- Postal code: 38010
- Dialing code: 0463
- Website: Official website

Sfruz is a comune (municipality) in Trentino in the northern Italian region Trentino-Alto Adige/Südtirol, with some 230 inhabitants in 2009 and an area of 11.7 square kilometres (4.5 mi^{2}).

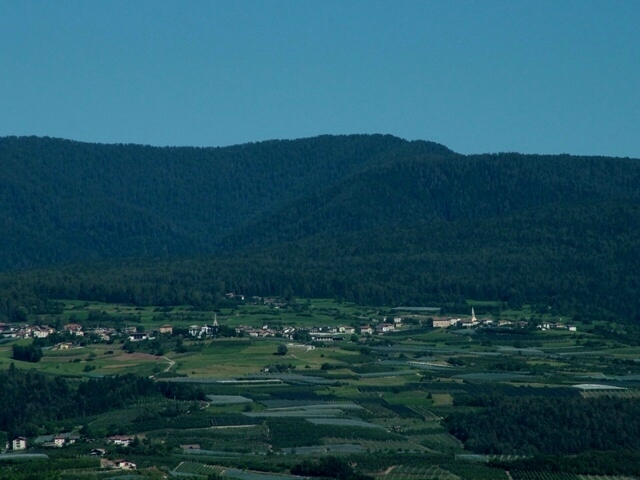
Aerial view of Sfruz

It is a traditional Alpine village, one of the highest in the Val di Non valley, and is located on a lush plateau between Monte Roen and the Corno di Tres. Its ancient origins have been proved by archaeological findings, which have brought to light a number of traditional roof-tiled Roman graves.

Sfruz has kept its original layout, with its rural homes and noble buildings featuring stone portals, halls and timber superstructures as well as a few frescoes. The church stands opposite via Predaia and shows a number of interesting architectural features in the local tradition, including a portal from 1704 with a crest and an unusual lancet arch. An alto-rilievo (high-relief) of S. Barbara - patron saint of miners - is located at the top of the road, after the playground. Sfruz's parish church is dedicated to S. Agatha.

The Sfruz potato is well renowned. Furthermore, the town is also a bastion for a number of important traditional craftsman jobs, such as goldsmiths and wood carvers. Its large pottery stoves are both characteristic and highly original. They have been manufactured since the Renaissance when they were sold - under the guide of "master stove-makers" - in Austria, Tyrol and Lombardy.

The 12 Percorsi d'Anaunia pass through Sfruz. Featuring signposted hiking trails based on an ancient road leading from Rocchetta to Castel Thun, the 12 Percorsi give travellers the chance to explore the conifer and beech woods between Sfruz and Smarano.

The municipality of Sfruz contains the frazione (subdivision) Credai.

Sfruz borders the following municipalities: Amblar, Don, Coredo, Tramin an der Weinstraße, Smarano and Tres.
