= Campodenno =

- Comune
- Comune di Campodenno
- Location within Italy Location within Trentino-Alto Adige/Südtirol
- Coordinates: 46°15′N 11°2′E
- Country: Italy
- Region: Trentino-Alto Adige/Südtirol
- Province: Trentino (TN)

Government
  - Mayor: Igor Portolan

Area
  - Total: 25.4 km^{2} (9.8 sq mi)

Population (2026)
  - Total: 1,532
  - Density: 60.3/km^{2} (156/sq mi)
- Time zone: UTC+1 (CET)
  - Summer (DST): UTC+2 (CEST)
- Postal code: 38010
- Dialing code: 0461
- Website: Official website

Campodenno (Ciamdadén or Campodén in local dialect) is a comune (municipality) in Trentino in the northern Italian region Trentino-Alto Adige/Südtirol, located about 20 kilometres (12 mi) northwest of Trento. As of 31 December 2004, it had a population of 1,454 and an area of 25.4 square kilometres (9.8 mi^{2}).

It includes the following frazioni (neighborhoods): Dercolo (Dercol), Lover, Quetta (Chèta), and Termon.

Campodenno borders the following municipalities: Tuenno, Denno, Ton, Sporminore, and Spormaggiore.

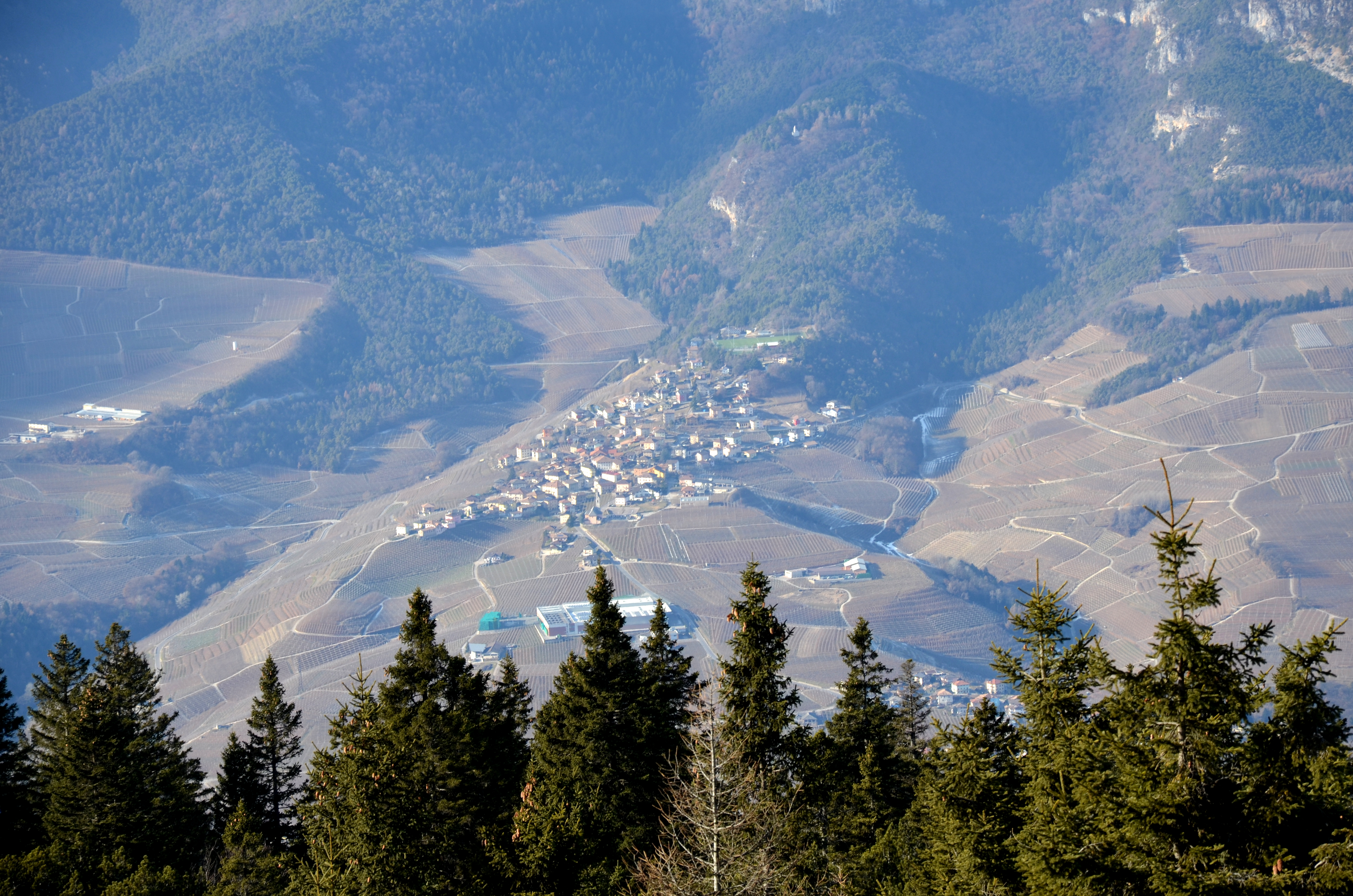
Campodenno from Malga Boldrina

== Demographic evolution ==
Historical population

Year	Pop.	±%
1861	?	—
1871	?	—
1881	?	—
1901	?	—
1911	?	—
1921	1,701	—
1931	1,605	−5.6%

Year	Pop.	±%
1936	1,482	−7.7%
1951	1,554	+4.9%
1961	1,517	−2.4%
1971	1,457	−4.0%
1981	1,386	−4.9%
1991	1,390	+0.3%
2001	1,436	+3.3%

Year	Pop.	±%
2012	1,493	+4.0%
2013	1,506	+0.9%
2014	1,500	−0.4%
2015	1,488	−0.8%
2016	1,500	+0.8%

Source: Data from ISTAT
