= Dercolo =

Human settlement in Campodenno, Trentino, Trentino-South Tyrol, Italy

Coordinates: 46°14′55″N 11°02′50″E

Dercolo is a district (frazione) of the municipality (comune) of Campodenno in the autonomous province of Trento, Italy.

== History ==
The toponym Dercolo derives from the Roman mythology of Hercules (Ercole, in the Italian language), who was venerated from the 4th century BC to the 3rd century AD in the Val di Non.

Dercolo became an autonomous community around 1928, the year in which it was joined to Denno.

== Monuments and places of interest ==
- Chiesa di Santo Stefano, built in 1479.
