= Conci =

Conci is an Italian surname. Notable people with the surname include:

- Elisabetta Conci (1895–1965), Italian politician
- Nicola Conci (born 1997), Italian cyclist
