= Ton, Trentino =

Ton
- Comune
- Comune di Ton
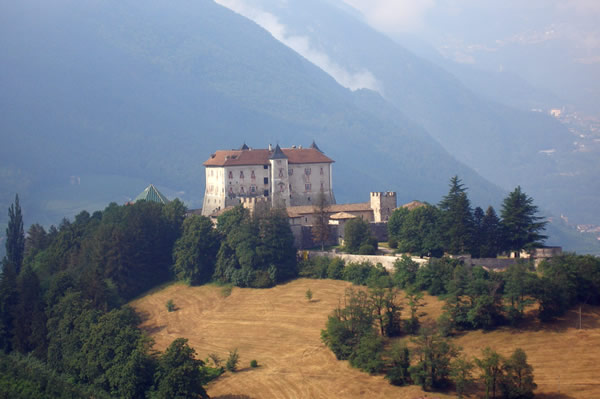
- View of Castel Thun

- Location within Italy Location within Trentino-Alto Adige/Südtirol
- Coordinates: 46°16′N 11°5′E
- Country: Italy
- Region: Trentino-Alto Adige/Südtirol
- Province: Trentino (TN)

Government
  - Mayor: Ivan Battan

Area
  - Total: 26.4 km^{2} (10.2 sq mi)

Population (Dec. 2004)
  - Total: 1,228
  - Density: 46.5/km^{2} (120/sq mi)
- Time zone: UTC+1 (CET)
  - Summer (DST): UTC+2 (CEST)
- Postal code: 38010
- Dialing code: 0461
- Website: Official website

Ton is a comune (municipality) in Trentino in the northern Italian region of Trentino-Alto Adige/Südtirol, located about 20 kilometres (12 mi) north of Trento. As of 31 December 2004, it had a population of 1,228 and an area of 26.4 square kilometres (10.2 mi^{2}).

Ton borders the following municipalities: Taio, Cortaccia sulla strada del vino, Vervò, Denno, Roverè della Luna, Campodenno, Mezzocorona, Sporminore, Spormaggiore and Mezzolombardo.

Ton is notable as the ancestral home of the Thun und Hohenstein family, with the first known progenitor being Manfreinus of Tunno in 1187. Castel Thun was a family seat from the 13th century until the late 20th century.

== Demographic evolution ==
Historical population

Year	Pop.	±%
1861	?	—
1871	?	—
1881	?	—
1901	?	—
1911	?	—

Year	Pop.	±%
1921	1,510	—
1931	1,448	−4.1%
1936	1,443	−0.3%
1951	1,488	+3.1%
1961	1,370	−7.9%

Year	Pop.	±%
1971	1,300	−5.1%
1981	1,189	−8.5%
1991	1,172	−1.4%
2001	1,199	+2.3%

Source: Data from ISTAT
