= Kurtatsch an der Weinstraße =

Kurtatsch
- Comune
- Gemeinde Kurtatsch an der Weinstraße; Comune di Cortaccia sulla Strada del Vino
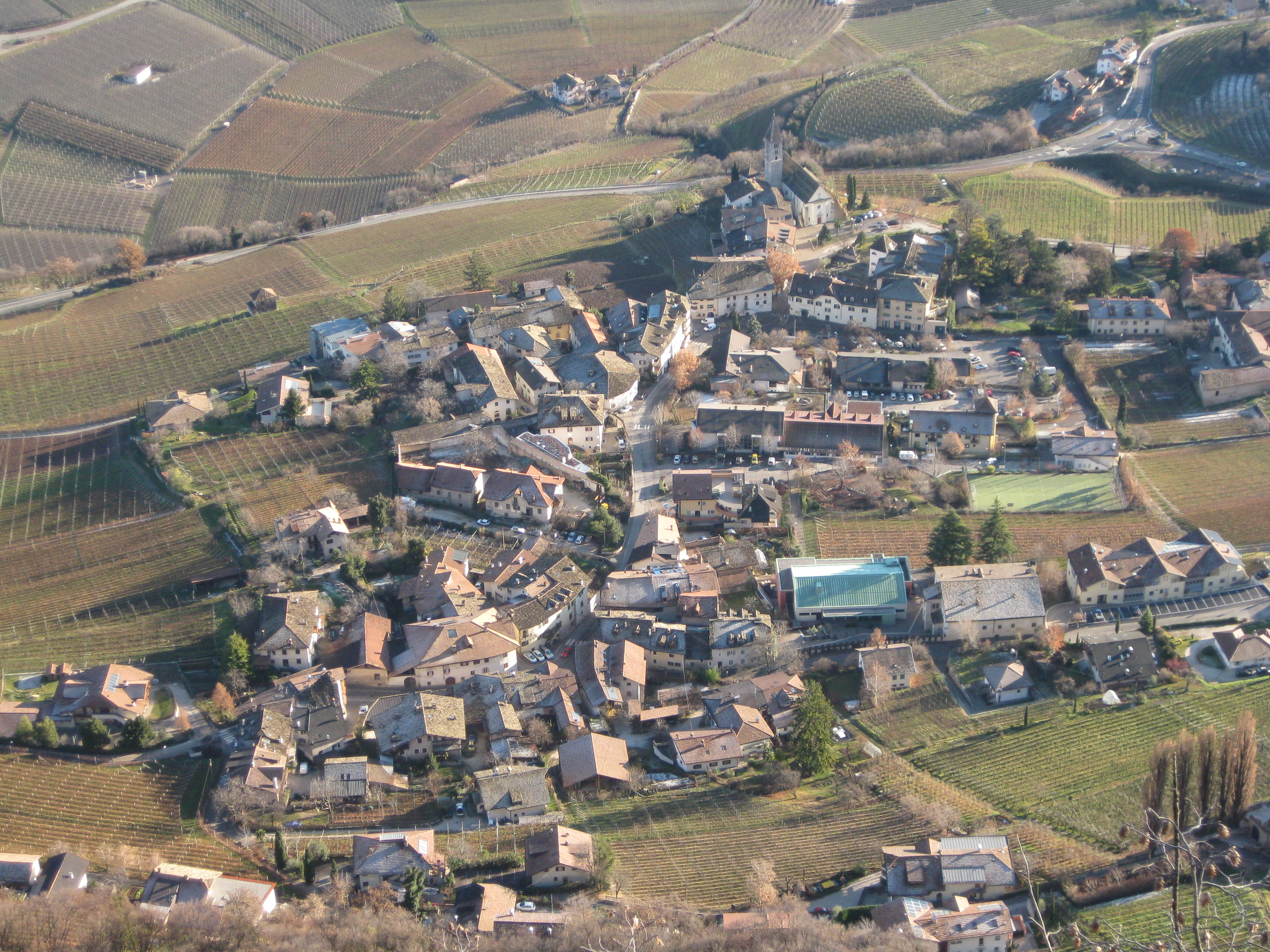
- View of Kurtatsch an der Weinstraße

- Coat of arms

- Location within Italy Location within Trentino-Alto Adige/Südtirol
- Coordinates: 46°19′N 11°13′E
- Country: Italy
- Region: Trentino-Alto Adige/Südtirol
- Province: South Tyrol (BZ)
- Frazioni: Entiklar (Niclara), Graun (Corona), Hofstatt, Oberfennberg (Favogna), Penon (Penone)

Government
  - Mayor: Andreas Anegg

Area
  - Total: 29.4 km^{2} (11.4 sq mi)
- Elevation: 333 m (1,093 ft)

Population (December 2018)
  - Total: 2,238
  - Density: 76.1/km^{2} (197/sq mi)
- Demonym(s): German: Kurtatscher; Italian: di Cortaccia
- Time zone: UTC+1 (CET)
  - Summer (DST): UTC+2 (CEST)
- Postal code: 39040
- Dialing code: 0471
- Website: Official website

Kurtatsch an der Weinstraße (Austrian German: [kʊrˈtatʃ an deːɐ̯ ˈvaɪnˌʃtraːsɛ]; Italian: Cortaccia sulla Strada del Vino [korˈtattʃa sulla ˈstraːda del ˈviːno]), often abbreviated to Kurtatsch or Cortaccia, is a comune (municipality) and a village in South Tyrol in northern Italy, located about 25 kilometres (16 mi) southwest of the city of Bolzano. Kurtatsch is one of the southernmost villages in the German-speaking area.

== Geography ==
The municipality of Kurtatsch is located in Unterland, a section of the Etschtal (Adige Valley) in the south of South Tyrol, on the orographic right (western) side of the valley. The main town, Kurtatsch (260-410 m above sea level), is slightly elevated at the foot of the Mendel ridge. The section of the valley floor below, which belongs to the municipality and borders Tramin to the north, Neumarkt to the east and Margreid to the south, reaches as far as the Adige. A little south of the main village, also only slightly above the valley floor, lies the Entiklar village (210-240 m). Kurtatsch also borders the following municipalities in the province Trentino: Coredo, Roverè della Luna, Ton, Tres, and Vervò.

Higher up and scattered across the low mountain slopes of the Mendel ridge are several farmsteads, hamlets and village settlements, which belong to another four groups. Graun (790-840 m) is located on a high plateau in the north of the 30.19 km² municipal area; to the west above the main town and Entiklar are Hofstatt, a scattered settlement without a real village center, and Penon (580-620 m), which is spread over hillside terraces; finally, in the south of the municipal area rises the Fennberg, on the northern half of whose plateau the Oberfennberg fraction (1160-1170 m) is located. The heights of the Mendel ridge, which is part of the Nonsberg group, rise to the west above the Kurtatsch settlement areas and form the border with Trentino. Among the less prominent peaks there, the Tresner Horn (1812 m) is the highest point in the municipality.

== History ==
Kurtatsch is first mentioned in documents in the so-called Vigilius letter from the 11th century as “Curtasze”. The origin of the name Kurtatsch (cf. lat. curtis: the farm) is considered by experts to be a collection of higher-lying farms.

=== Prehistory ===
A series of scattered finds and archaeological finds prove that some sites were settled in the Middle and Late Stone Age. A Bronze Age menhir dating back to the 3rd millennium BC was found in the village of Rungg, which at times belonged to Kurtatsch and is now in the Tyrolean State Museum in Innsbruck. A menhir blank was found in front of the nursing home in Kurtatsch, and several bowl stones in Graun also point to the Bronze Age. The Kurtatsch local historian Luis Hauser found a copper smelting site with smelting furnaces in Fennhals, which is now in the Archaeology Museum in Bozen/Bolzano.

=== Antiquity ===
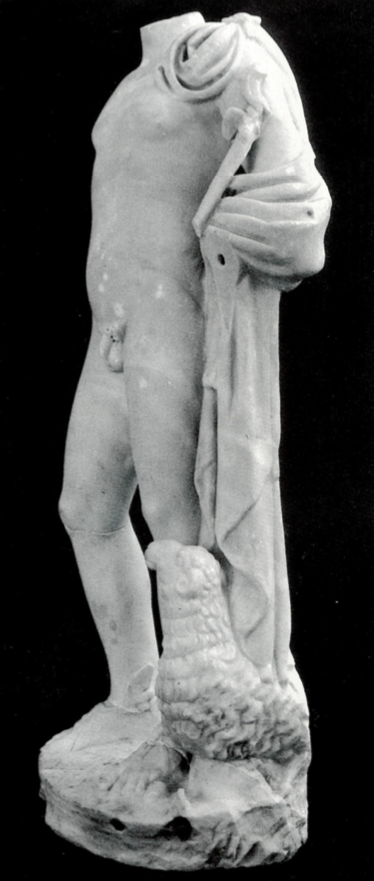
Statue of Roman god Mercurius

Numerous Roman finds were made in the area of today's Kurtatsch, especially on the hill of today's parish church. The remains of a Roman villa were found there. Wooden parts of a vine dating back to the 3rd century were found in the Nockerisch area.

The discovery of a marble torso in 1860 in the atrium of today's rectory was spectacular. The 68 cm high statue depicts the Roman god Mercurius and can be found in the museum of Buonconsiglio Castle in Trento (at the time of the find, the parish of Kurtatsch still belonged to the archbishopric of Trento). The statue's head and hands were probably cut off in the course of Christianization.

As there is a circle of pillars with a diameter of six meters under the presbytery of the present parish church, it is assumed that the Christian church was built on a Roman temple. Pieces of pillars found are made of red marble and have a diameter of 32 cm. Where a meeting room next to the church is located today, there used to be an urn field, but only a few pottery fragments bear witness to this.During the construction of the parking lot next to the church in 1970, a Roman-era stone sarcophagus was found. A Roman millstone is currently in the Bolzano City Museum. Coins of the Macedonian kings Alexander III (Alexander the Great), Alexander IV, Philip III and Antigonus I were also unearthed.

=== Middle Ages ===
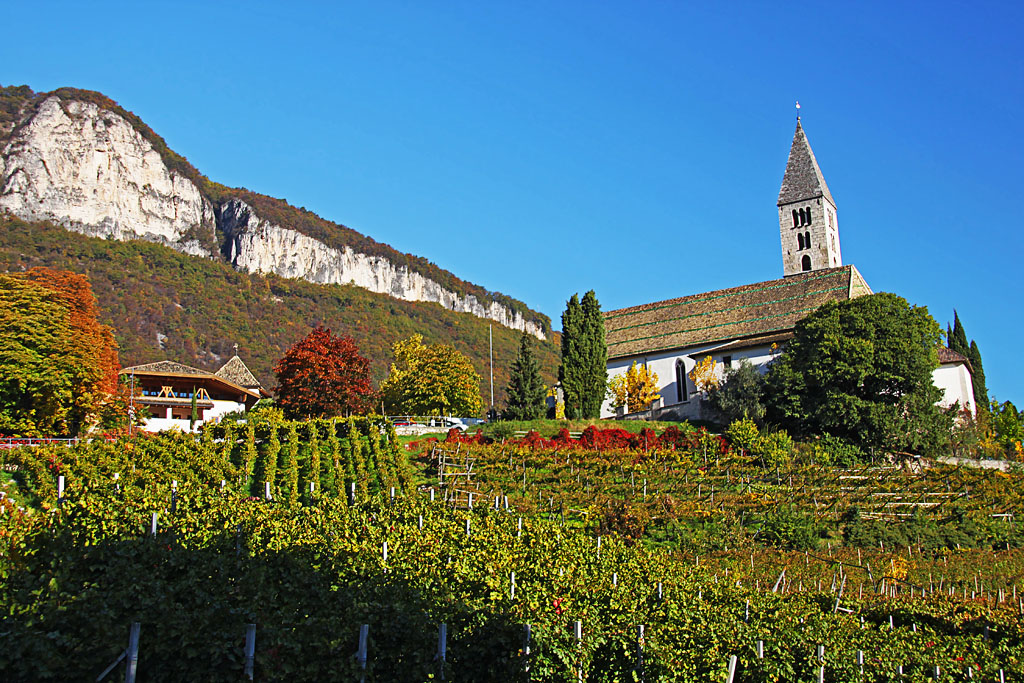
Medieval Vigilius Church

After the collapse of the Western Roman Empire, Kurtatsch was the seat of a Lombard curtis around 580. It was therefore also a place of jurisdiction, whose designation as curtis regia was transferred to today's place name. It is not known whether the town had a Lombard castle, nor whether there was already an Arian church in the 6th century. It was probably at least the seat of the Lombard duke Ewin of Trento. This is indicated by the remains of foundation walls found during road construction.

Like a number of other places on the western side of the southern lowlands, the village belonged to the diocese of Trento and was bishop's land. It is possible that the legendary Vigilius of Trent came to this part of the lowlands around 400 A.D. and laid the foundations for a Vigilius chapel, although the patronage was not documented until after 1300. In 1328, the Vigilius Chapel is attested as part of the parish of Kaltern (ecclesia et capela sancti Vigillii de Cortaz plebis Caldari).

A second early chapel dedicated to Valentine of Passau is enigmatic. Valentin was an itinerant bishop who came from the north around 420 A.D., wandered to Trento and is said to have died later in a hermitage near Meran/Merano. The chapel or church, which was mentioned in a few documents, has disappeared today.

=== Renaissance and early modern times ===
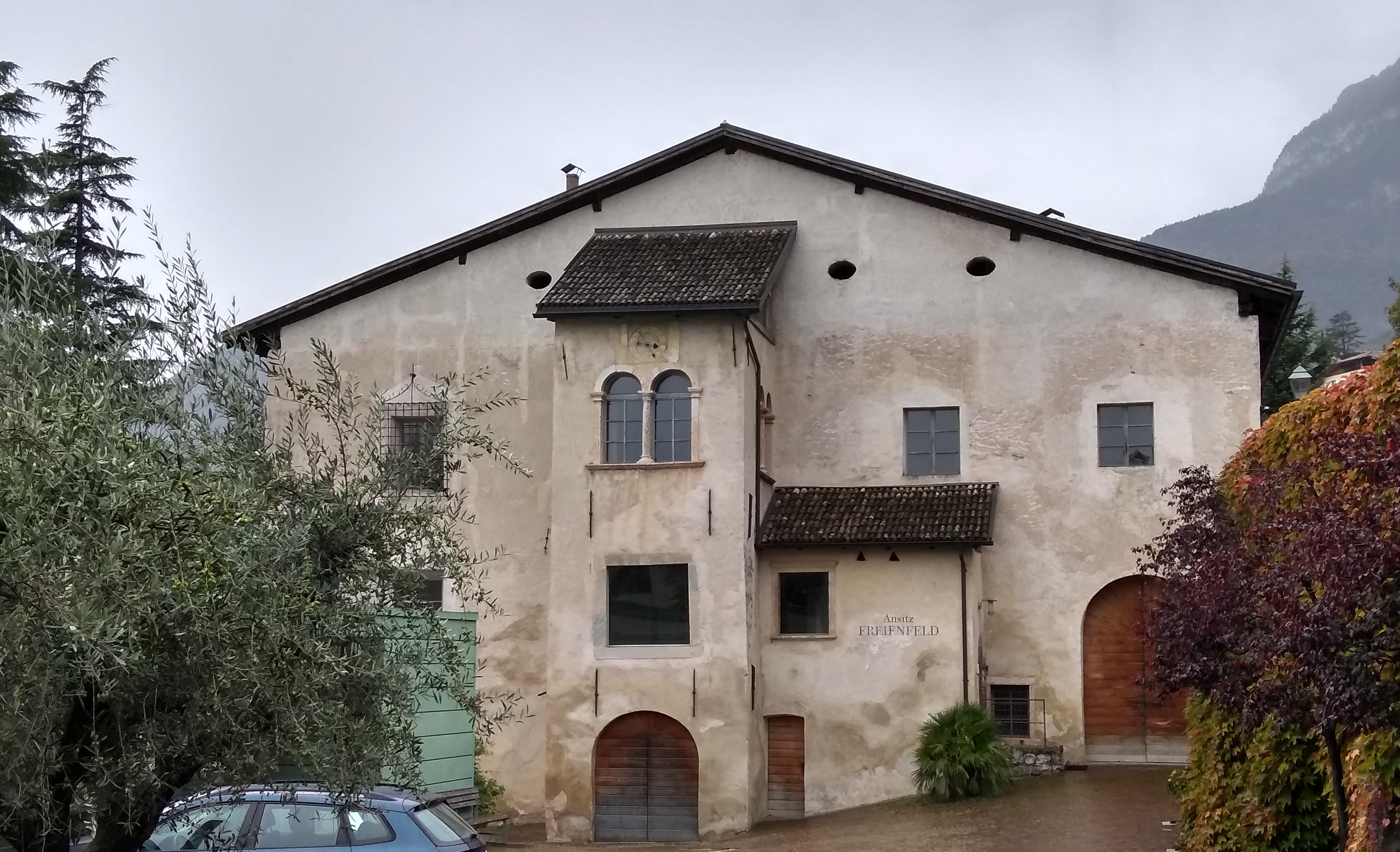
Ansitz Freienfeld

Several stately residences were built in the 15th and 16th centuries. Strehlburg Castle was first mentioned in 1492 and is known for its cycle of Old Testament frescoes from the 16th century (creation of Eve, fall of man, judgement of Solomon, the three young men in the fiery furnace). The Freienfeld residence contains well-preserved frescoes with grotesques, depictions of Ovid's Metamorphoses and the judgement of Paris.

=== 20th century ===
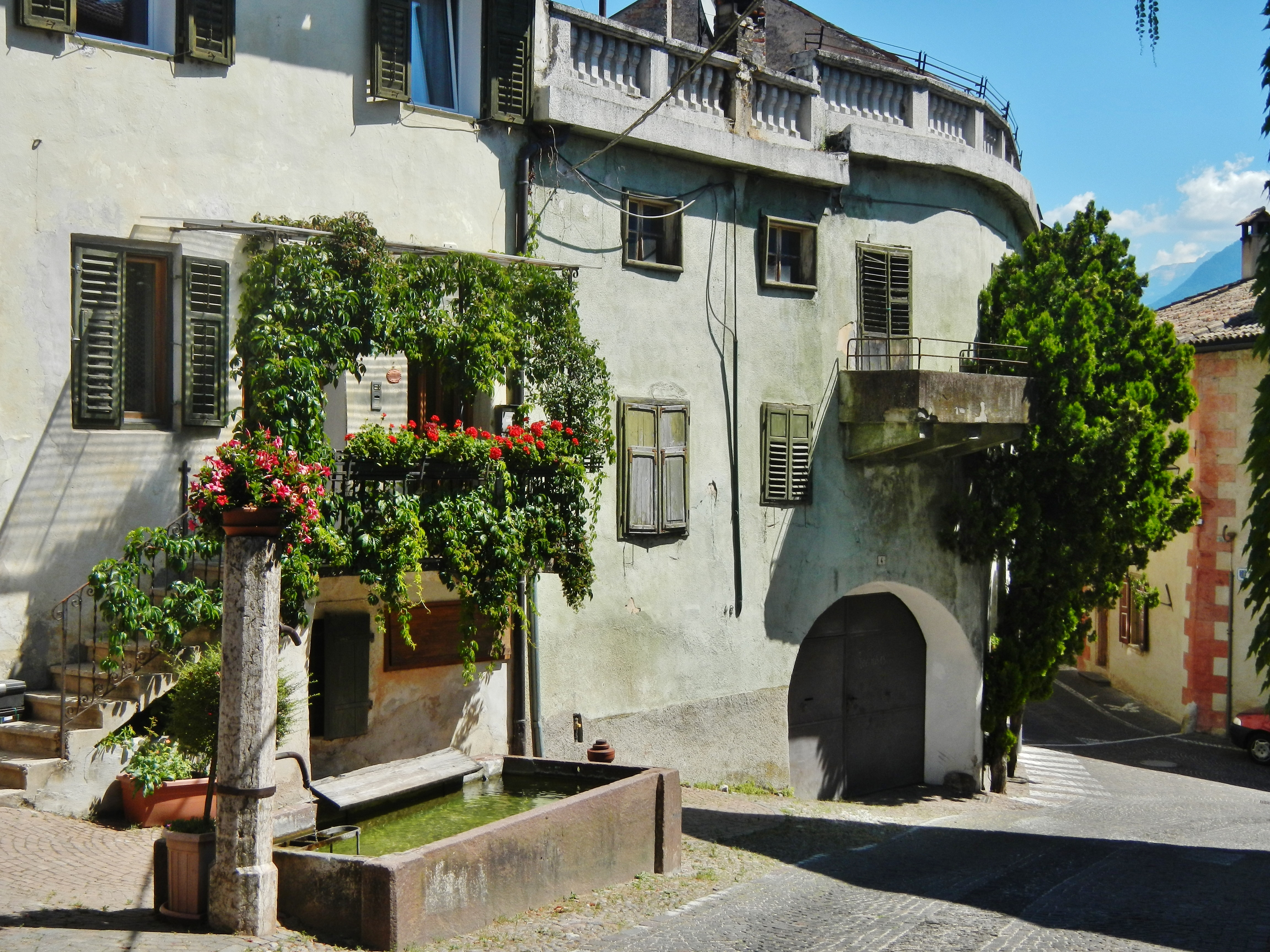
Historical center of Kurtatsch village

Until the end of the World War I, Kurtatsch belonged to the County of Tyrol and thus to Austria-Hungary. Within Tyrol, Kurtatsch was assigned to the judicial district of Kaltern, which in turn was part of the district of Bozen/Bolzano. With the Treaty of Saint-Germain in 1919, Kurtatsch became part of the Kingdom of Italy together with the majority of Tyrol south of the main Alpine ridge. When the two provinces of Bolzano and Trento were created on these former Austrian territories in 1927, Kurtatsch and some other surrounding municipalities were added to the predominantly Italian-speaking province of Trento. With the fall of Benito Mussolini and the German occupation of northern Italy in 1943, South Tyrol - and thus also Kurtatsch - came directly under National Socialist rule as the "Operational Zone of the Alpine Foothills". At the end of the war in 1945, the area came back under Italian administration and Kurtatsch once again became part of the province of Trento. It was not until 1948 that Kurtatsch was moved from the province of Trento to the province of Bolzano.

The municipality of Kurtatsch also changed geographically in the 20th century: In 1913 it lost the village of Söll and in 1978 the village of Rungg to Tramin. Ecclesiastical affiliation also changed over the course of the 20th century: the parish of Kurtatsch, which had always belonged to the Archdiocese of Trento, became part of the newly formed diocese of Bozen/Bolzano-Brixen/Bressanone on August 6, 1964 through the papal bull Quo aptius together with the South Tyrolean Unterland.

Since 1971, the municipality has had the promotional addition an der Weinstraße in its official name.

== Coat of arms ==
The emblem shows an or postillion hornet with tassels on azure background; at the corners are placed four six-pointed or stars. The postillon’s hornet indicates that the village was a postal station; the star represent the four villages in the municipality. The emblem was adopted in 1967.

== Historic sights ==
- Schloss Nussegg
- Ansitz Freienfeld
- Ansitz Strehlburg
- Ansitz Nussdorf
- Ansitz Fohrhof
- Ansitz Eberlehof
- Ansitz Baron von Widmann
- Finkenhof House

== Linguistic distribution ==
According to the 2024 census, 95.79% of the population speak German, 3.96% Italian and 0.25% Ladin as first language.
