= Ansitz Eberlehof =

Ansitz in South Tyrol

Coordinates: 46.315387°N 11.21989°E

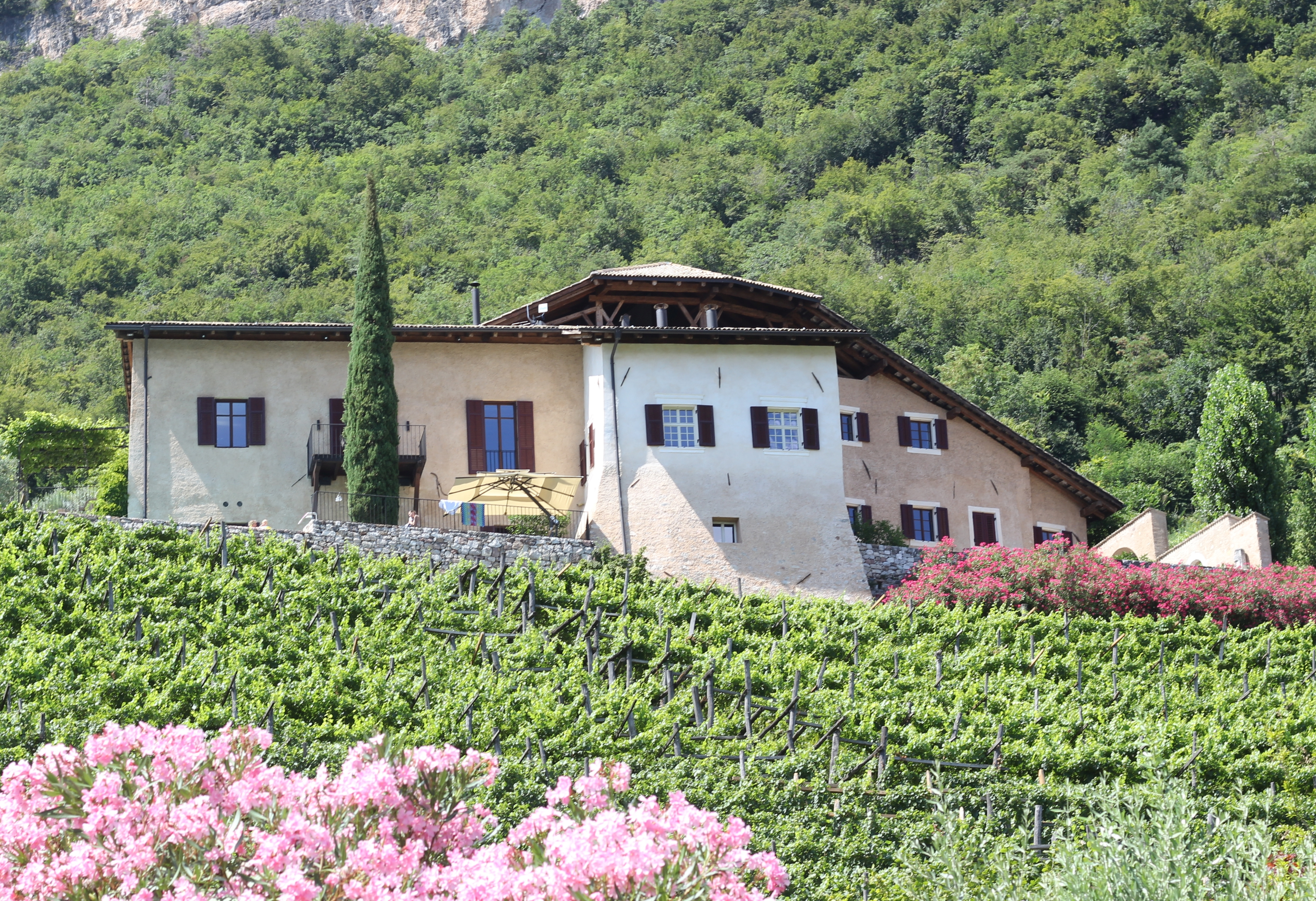
Eberle in Kurtatsch

Ansitz Eberlehof is an Ansitz in Kurtatsch an der Weinstraße, South Tyrol, Italy. The manor was built in the Gothic style on a hillside, overlooking the valley. The Indermaur family's coat of arms is displayed on one the sandstone door frames, having been built by the family in the early 16th century. In 1600, a southeast wing was constructed in the Renaissance style with frescoes. The estate includes farm buildings as well as the manor house. After the Indermaur, the manor passed to Baroness Maria Theresia von Winkelhofen in the mid 1700s, the Gruber family in 1805, the Schasser family in 1839, the Eberle family in 1856, and later the Pomella. The current owners are the Mair family.
