= Ville d'Anaunia =

- Comune
- Comune di Ville d'Anaunia
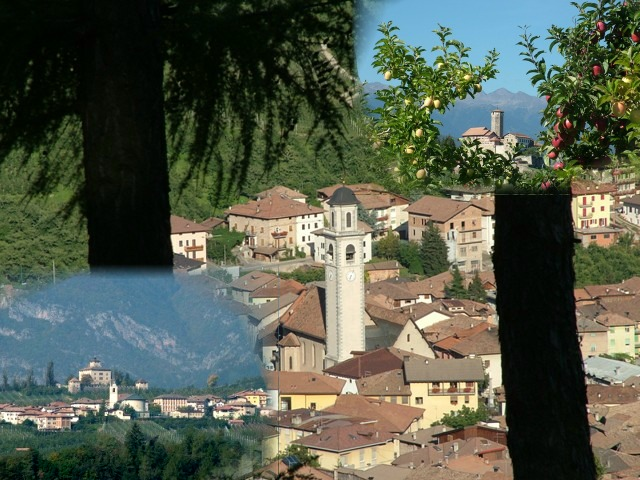

- Location within Italy Location within Trentino-Alto Adige/Südtirol
- Coordinates: 46°19′N 11°3′E
- Country: Italy
- Region: Trentino-Alto Adige/Südtirol
- Province: Trentino (TN)

Government
  - Mayor: Fausto Pallaver

Area
  - Total: 89.13 km^{2} (34.41 sq mi)

Population (30 November 2017)
  - Total: 4,852
  - Density: 54.44/km^{2} (141.0/sq mi)
- Time zone: UTC+1 (CET)
  - Summer (DST): UTC+2 (CEST)
- Postal code: 38019
- Dialing code: 0463
- Website: Official website

Ville d'Anaunia is a comune (municipality) in the Province of Trentino in the Italian region Trentino-Alto Adige/Südtirol.

It was established on 1 January 2016 by the merger of the municipalities of Nanno, Tassullo and Tuenno.
