= Ansitz Fohrhof =

Ansitz in South Tyrol

Coordinates: 46.314291°N 11.216306°E

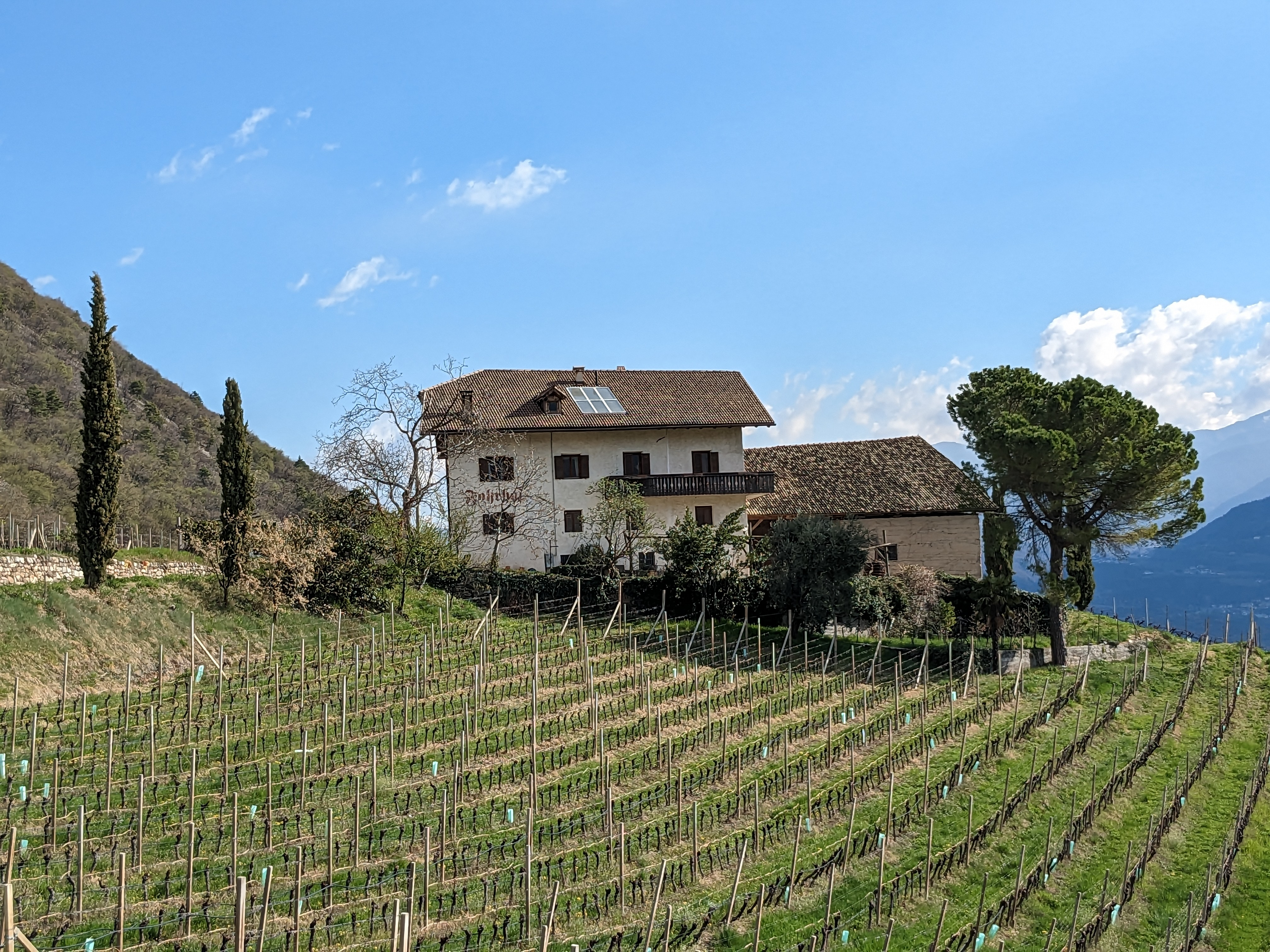
Fohrhof

Fohrhof is an Ansitz in Kurtatsch an der Weinstraße, South Tyrol, Italy. The Anich family's coat of arms are displayed on the main doorway. The manor consists of a house, a small Catholic chapel, and farmland.

The manor was owned by the von Schlandersperg in 1557, then the In der Maur in 1645, the Sattler in 1780, and the Romani in 1803. Fohrhof still operates as a large wine farm.
