= Spormaggiore =

- Comune
- Comune di Spormaggiore
- Coat of arms

- Location within Italy Location within Trentino-Alto Adige/Südtirol
- Coordinates: 46°13′N 11°3′E
- Country: Italy
- Region: Trentino-Alto Adige/Südtirol
- Province: Trentino (TN)

Government
  - Mayor: Alessandro Pezzi

Area
  - Total: 30.2 km^{2} (11.7 sq mi)

Population (Dec. 2004)
  - Total: 1,233
  - Density: 40.8/km^{2} (106/sq mi)
- Demonym: Sporeggiani
- Time zone: UTC+1 (CET)
  - Summer (DST): UTC+2 (CEST)
- Postal code: 38010
- Dialing code: 0461
- Website: Official website

Spormaggiore (Sporgrànt or Spór in local dialect) is a comune (municipality) in Trentino in the northern Italian region Trentino-Alto Adige/Südtirol, located about 15 kilometres (9 mi) northwest of Trento. As of October 2011, it had a population of 1,259 and an area of 30.2 square kilometres (11.7 mi^{2}).

Spormaggiore borders the following municipalities: Tuenno, Ton, Campodenno, Sporminore, Mezzolombardo, Fai della Paganella, Cavedago and Molveno.

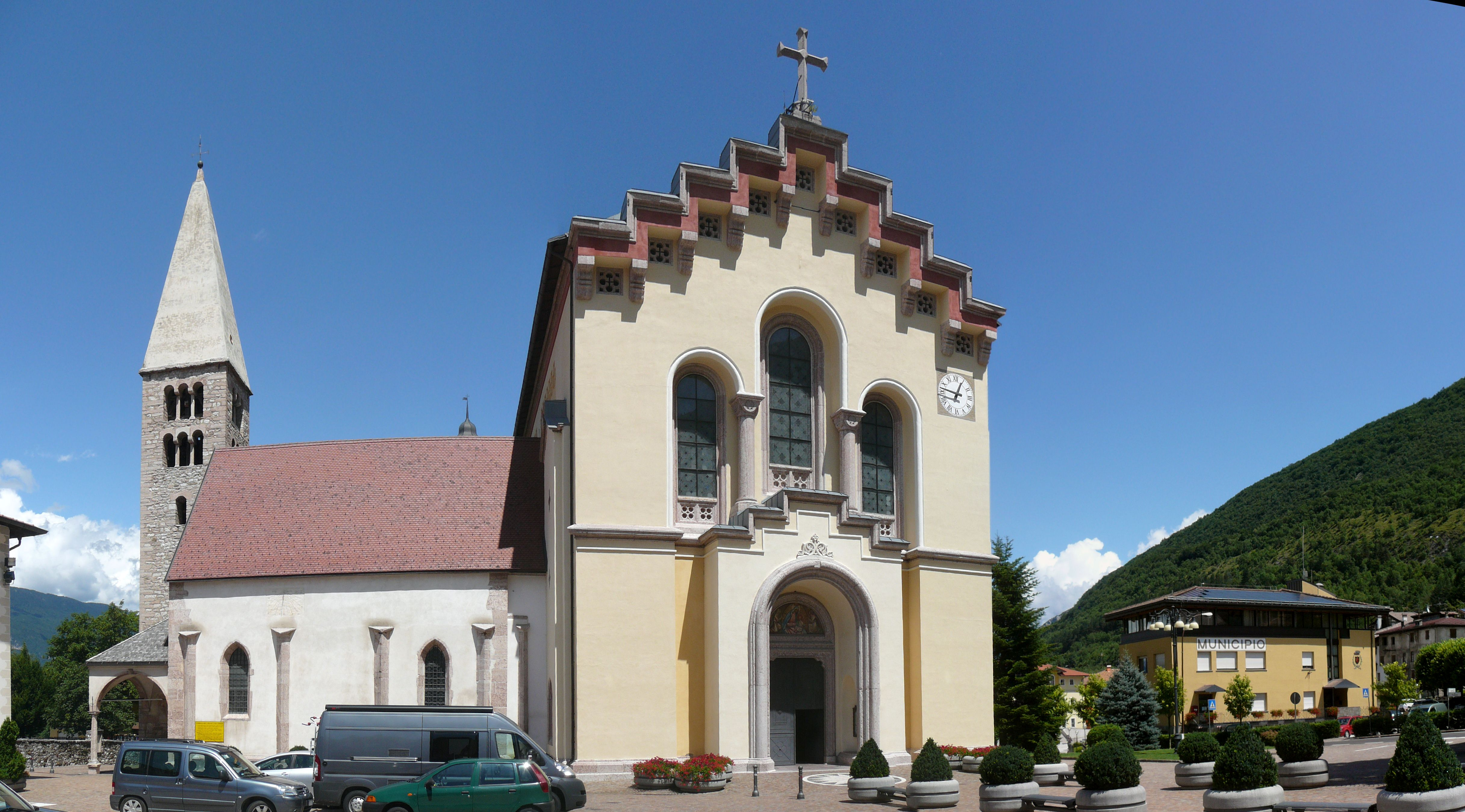
Parish church

== Demographic evolution ==
Historical population

| Year | Pop. | ±% |
|---|---|---|
| 1861 | ? | — |
| 1871 | ? | — |
| 1881 | ? | — |
| 1901 | ? | — |
| 1911 | ? | — |

| Year | Pop. | ±% |
|---|---|---|
| 1921 | 1,746 | — |
| 1931 | 1,413 | −19.1% |
| 1936 | 1,272 | −10.0% |
| 1951 | 1,305 | +2.6% |
| 1961 | 1,152 | −11.7% |

| Year | Pop. | ±% |
|---|---|---|
| 1971 | 1,079 | −6.3% |
| 1981 | 1,023 | −5.2% |
| 1991 | 1,062 | +3.8% |
| 2001 | 1,175 | +10.6% |
| 2011 | 1,259 | +7.1% |

Source: Data from ISTAT
