= Schloss Nussegg =

Castle in South Tyrol

Coordinates: 46.309094°N 11.212548°E

- Schloss Nußegg (German)
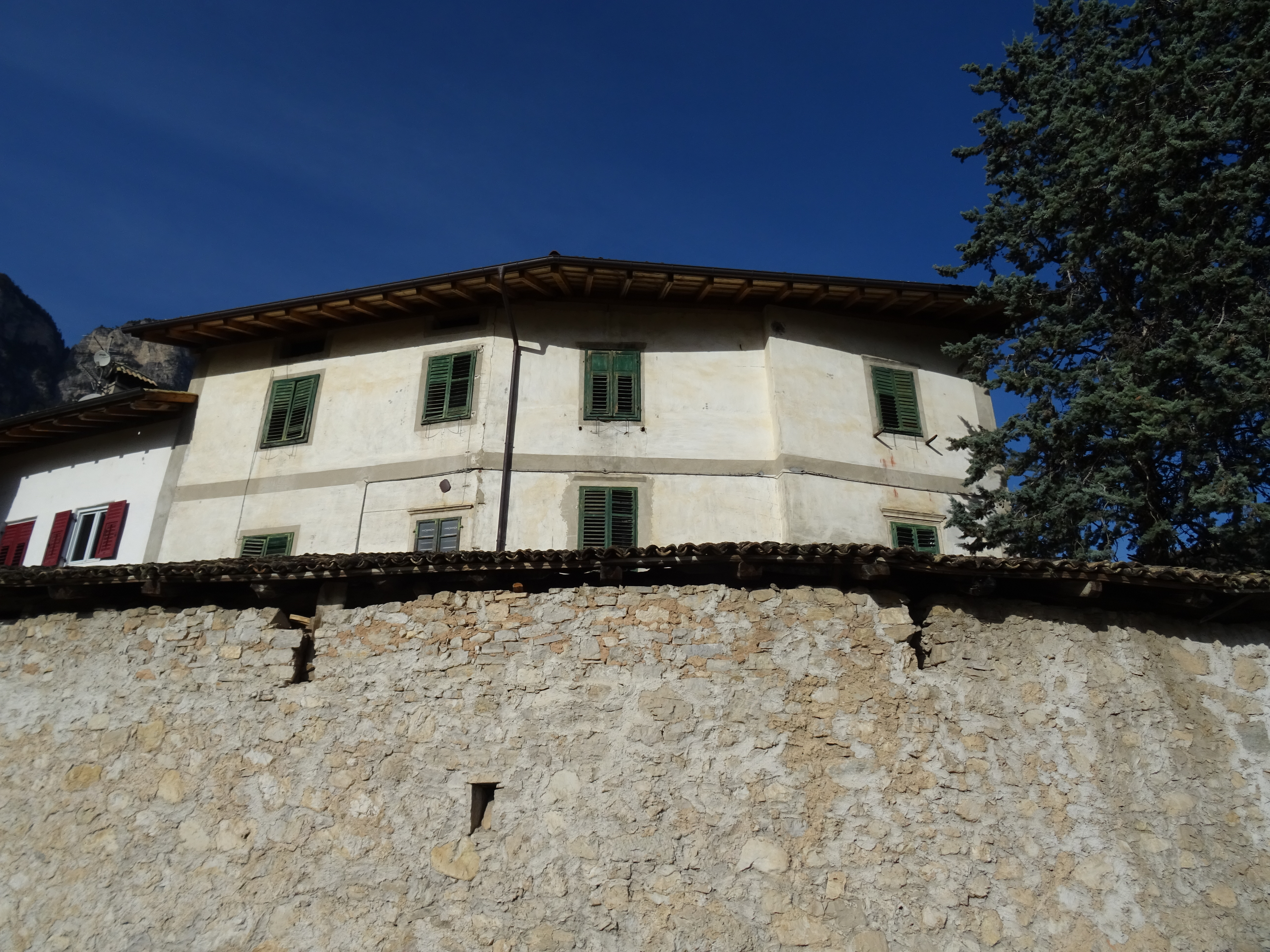
- The castle in 2022
- Interactive map of Schloss Nussegg
- Type: Schloss
- Location: Kurtatsch an der Weinstraße, South Tyrol, Italy

History
- Built: 16th century

Site notes
- Owner: Truefer family (former); Indermaur family (former); Fenner family (former); Kager family (former); Sanoll family

Schloss Nußegg (or Schloss Nussegg) is an ansitz in Kurtatsch an der Weinstraße, South Tyrol. Nussegg was acquired by the Truefer family in 1570. Ownership later passed to the Indermaur family in 1623, the Fenner family in 1716, the Kager family in 1819, and lastly to the Sanoll family, who have owned the property since 1820. The castle includes a house built into the hillside, an adjoining building, a barn, and a fortified wall with an inner courtyard. The year 1597 is engraved on a boundary stone in the courtyard.
