= Roveré della Luna =

- Comune
- Comune di Roverè della Luna
- Coat of arms

- Location within Italy Location within Trentino-Alto Adige/Südtirol
- Coordinates: 46°15′N 11°10′E
- Country: Italy
- Region: Trentino-Alto Adige/Südtirol
- Province: Trentino (TN)

Government
  - Mayor: Germano Preghenella

Area
  - Total: 10.4 km^{2} (4.0 sq mi)
- Elevation: 251 m (823 ft)

Population (31 August 2010)
  - Total: 1,610
  - Density: 155/km^{2} (401/sq mi)
- Demonym: Roveraideri
- Time zone: UTC+1 (CET)
  - Summer (DST): UTC+2 (CEST)
- Postal code: 38030
- Dialing code: 0461
- Website: Official website

Roveré della Luna (Roverè in local dialect) is a comune (municipality) in Trentino in the northern Italian region Trentino-Alto Adige/Südtirol, located about 20 kilometres (12 mi) north of Trento.

Roveré della Luna borders the following municipalities: Kurtatsch, Vervò, Margreid, Ton, Salorno and Mezzocorona.
