= Vervò =

- Comune
- Comune di Vervò
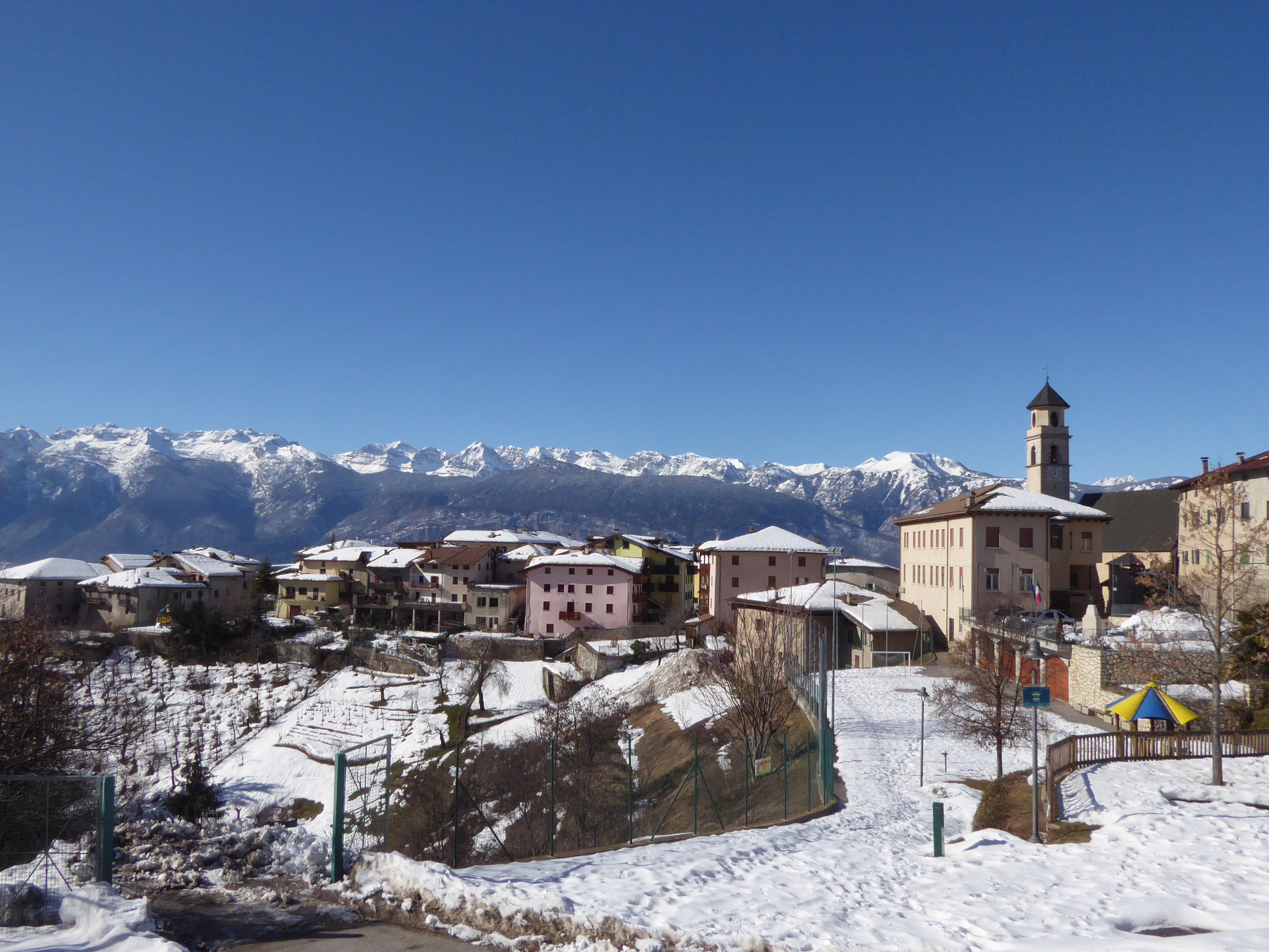

- Location within Italy Location within Trentino-Alto Adige/Südtirol
- Coordinates: 46°18′N 11°7′E
- Country: Italy
- Region: Trentino-Alto Adige/Südtirol
- Province: Trentino (TN)

Government
  - Mayor: Chini Claudio

Area
  - Total: 15.2 km^{2} (5.9 sq mi)

Population (Dec. 2004)
  - Total: 694
  - Density: 45.7/km^{2} (118/sq mi)
- Time zone: UTC+1 (CET)
  - Summer (DST): UTC+2 (CEST)
- Postal code: 38010
- Dialing code: 0463

Vervò (Vervòu in local dialect) was a comune (municipality) in Trentino in the northern Italian region Trentino-Alto Adige/Südtirol, located about 25 kilometres (16 mi) north of Trento. As of 31 December 2004, it had a population of 694 and an area of 15.2 square kilometres (5.9 sq mi). It was merged with Coredo, Smarano, Taio and Tres on January 1, 2015, to form a new municipality, Predaia.

Vervò borders the following municipalities: Taio, Kurtatsch an der Weinstraße, Tres, Ton and Roverè della Luna.

== Demographic evolution ==
Historical population

| Year | Pop. | ±% |
|---|---|---|
| 1861 | ? | — |
| 1871 | ? | — |
| 1881 | ? | — |
| 1901 | ? | — |
| 1911 | ? | — |

| Year | Pop. | ±% |
|---|---|---|
| 1921 | 835 | — |
| 1931 | 700 | −16.2% |
| 1936 | 647 | −7.6% |
| 1951 | 662 | +2.3% |
| 1961 | 662 | +0.0% |

| Year | Pop. | ±% |
|---|---|---|
| 1971 | 644 | −2.7% |
| 1981 | 649 | +0.8% |
| 1991 | 630 | −2.9% |
| 2001 | 676 | +7.3% |

Source: Data from ISTAT
