= Contà =

Italian comune

- Comune
- Comune di Contà
- Location within Italy Location within Trentino-Alto Adige/Südtirol
- Coordinates: 46°17′N 11°02′E
- Country: Italy
- Region: Trentino-Alto Adige/Südtirol
- Province: Trentino (TN)

Government
  - Mayor: Eric Rossi

Area
  - Total: 19.48 km^{2} (7.52 sq mi)

Population (2026)
  - Total: 1,423
  - Density: 73.05/km^{2} (189.2/sq mi)
- Time zone: UTC+1 (CET)
  - Summer (DST): UTC+2 (CEST)
- Postal code: 38093
- Dialing code: 0461
- Website: Official website

Saint Lawrence church in Contà

Contà is a comune (municipality) in Trentino in the northern Italian region Trentino-Alto Adige/Südtirol. It was formed on 1 January 2016 as the merger of the previous communes of Cunevo, Flavon and Terres.
