= Ansitz Baron von Widmann =

Ansitz in South Tyrol

Coordinates: 46.31249°N 11.22137°E

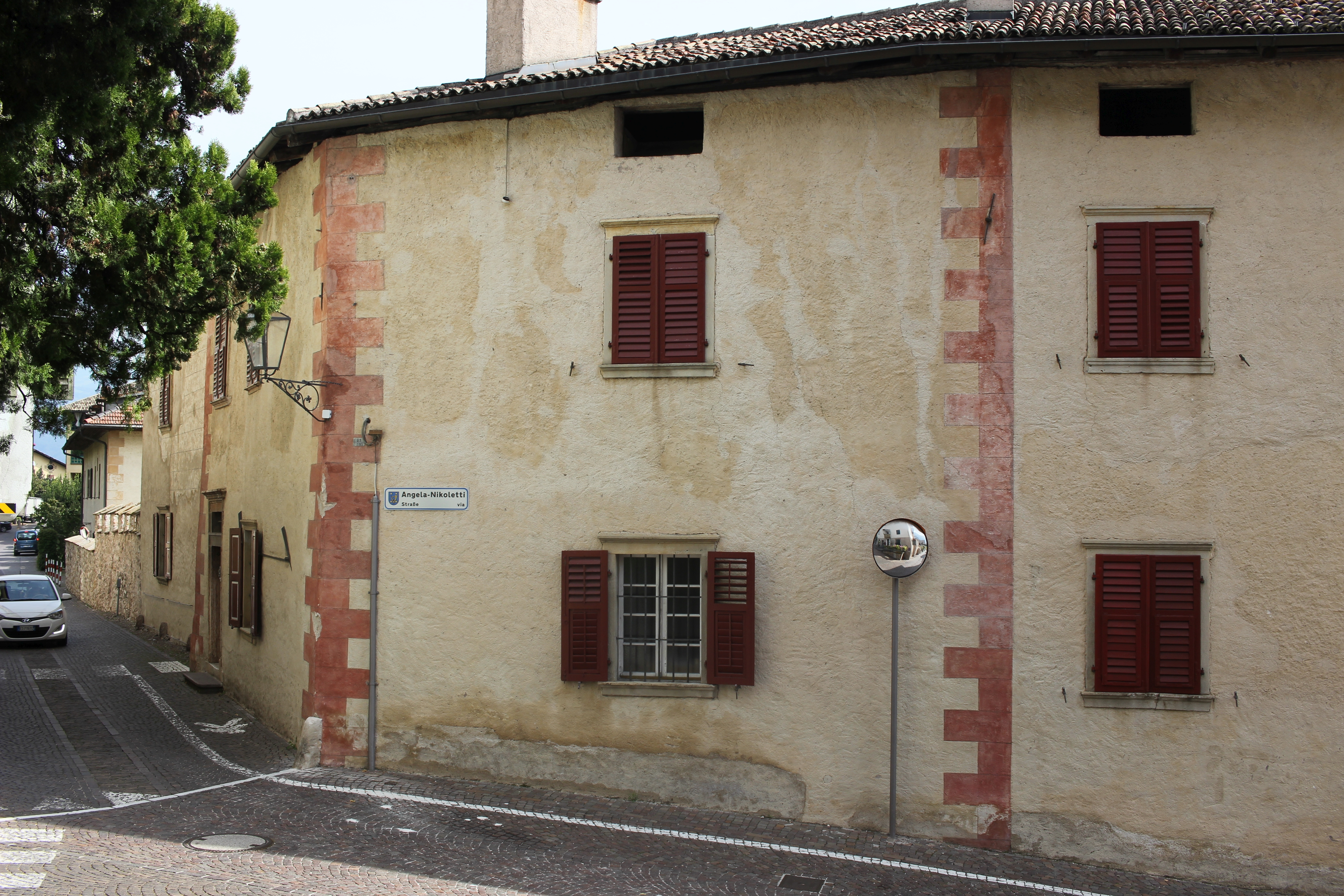
Ansitz Baron von Widmann, also known as Ansitz Staffelfeld

Ansitz Baron von Widmann is an Ansitz located in Kurtatsch an der Weinstraße, South Tyrol, Italy. The house has also been called Ansitz Staffelfeld, the Indermaur House and the Great Payr House. The Gothic-style main house, along with the horse stalls and barn, are the oldest part of the property. Expansions were made on the house in 1708. Additions to the first and second floors were made in 1860. Renovations and expansions continued on into the late twentieth century. The cellars are still used for the wines of the estate, currently owned by the Baron von Widmann. A relief of the family crest of the In der Maur family, the original owners, was added above the second floor exterior doorframe in 1676. At one time, the northern part of the mansion housed business offices of the Raiffeisen Bank. The estate is now the seat of the Baron Widmann winery.

The house was owned by the Indermaur family, then the family von Arbogast in 1758, the family von Payr through the marriage of Helena Franziska von Indermaur in 1763, the Kager family in 1783 when purchased by Johann Mathias von Kager, and then the von Widmann family in 1867 through the marriage of Alfons von Widmann to the sister of Karl von Kager.
