= Tres, Trentino =

Tres
- Frazione
- Comune di Tres
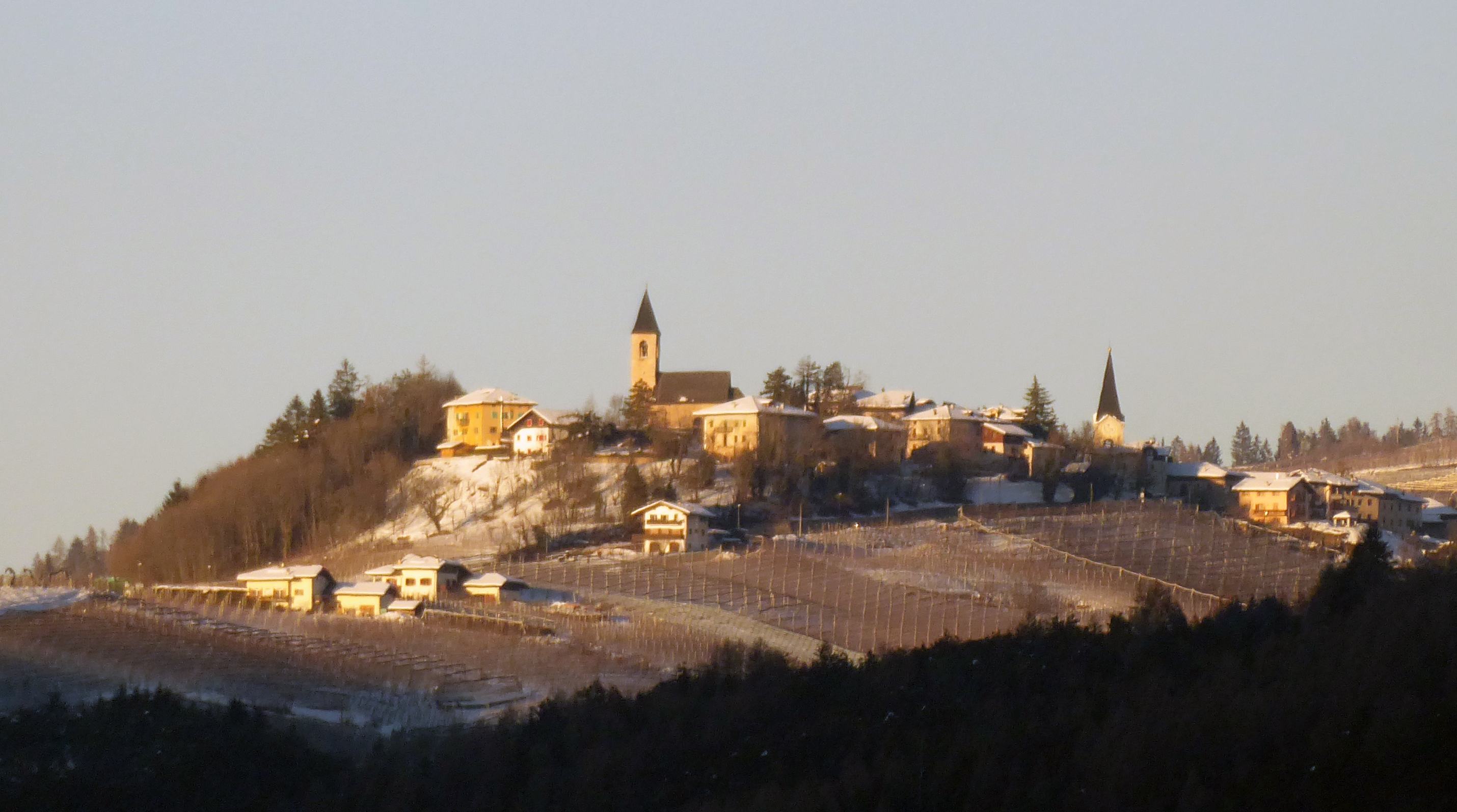

- Location of Tres in Italy
- Coordinates: 46°19′N 11°6′E
- Country: Italy
- Region: Trentino-Alto Adige/Südtirol
- Province: Trentino (TN)

Area
  - Total: 14.5 km^{2} (5.6 sq mi)

Population (Dec. 2004)
  - Total: 667
  - Density: 46.0/km^{2} (119/sq mi)
- Time zone: UTC+1 (CET)
  - Summer (DST): UTC+2 (CEST)
- Postal code: 38010
- Dialing code: 0463

Tres was a comune (municipality) in Trentino in the northern Italian region Trentino-Alto Adige/Südtirol, located about 30 kilometres (19 mi) north of Trento. As of 31 December 2004, it had a population of 667 and an area of 14.5 square kilometres (5.6 mi^{2}). It was merged with Coredo, Smarano, Taio and Vervò on January 1, 2015, to form a new municipality, Predaia.

Tres borders the following municipalities: Coredo, Smarano, Sfruz, Taio, Cortaccia sulla strada del vino and Vervò.

== Demographic evolution ==
Historical population

| Year | Pop. | ±% |
|---|---|---|
| 1861 | ? | — |
| 1871 | ? | — |
| 1881 | ? | — |
| 1901 | ? | — |
| 1911 | ? | — |

| Year | Pop. | ±% |
|---|---|---|
| 1921 | 924 | — |
| 1931 | 676 | −26.8% |
| 1936 | 626 | −7.4% |
| 1951 | 642 | +2.6% |
| 1961 | 591 | −7.9% |

| Year | Pop. | ±% |
|---|---|---|
| 1971 | 513 | −13.2% |
| 1981 | 503 | −1.9% |
| 1991 | 566 | +12.5% |
| 2001 | 657 | +16.1% |

Source: Data from ISTAT
