= Finkenhof House =

House in South Tyrol

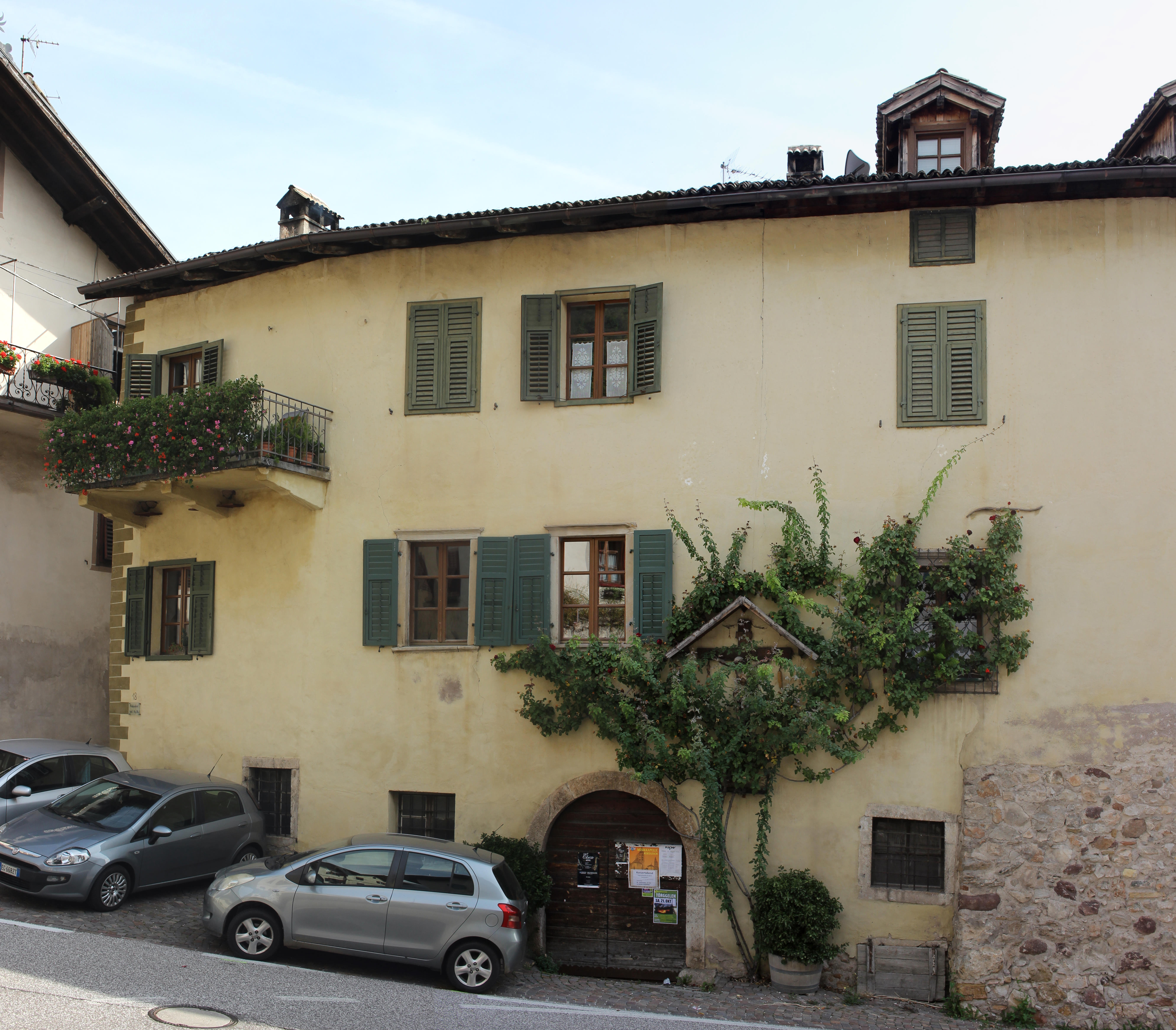
The "Finkenhof"

Finkenhof is a house in Kurtatsch an der Weinstraße, South Tyrol, Italy. The house was built around the beginning of the 16th century by the Indermaur family and was closely connected to the newly erected manor Ansitz Freienfeld. The Indermaur coat of arms is visible on the staircase. It is likely that the farmhouse served as a “Torggl” (wine press) and wine cellar, as well as accommodation for servants or “Baumänner” (tenant-farmers). From that time several windows with stone frames and grilles, a masonry stairway with round arches, the vaulted cellar on square pillars, a kitchen with a groin-vault and remains of a beam ceiling (16th century) have been preserved. In the 17th century the farm was extended southwards and enlarged; a parlour with a richly profiled coffered ceiling and an elaborate stucco ceiling with egg-and-dart motif testify to wealthy inhabitants. In 1838, the house was expanded by adding a second floor. Documented changes of ownership: Im Holz Martin (1566), Dellmann from Angerburg (1780), Josef Schweiggl (Schwarzadler-wirt, 1834), Pomella (1838), Mair (1914)
