= Sporminore =

- Comune
- Comune di Sporminore
- Location within Italy Location within Trentino-Alto Adige/Südtirol
- Coordinates: 46°14′N 11°2′E
- Country: Italy
- Region: Trentino-Alto Adige/Südtirol
- Province: Trentino (TN)

Government
  - Mayor: Diego Giovannini

Area
  - Total: 17.5 km^{2} (6.8 sq mi)

Population (Dec. 2004)
  - Total: 695
  - Density: 39.7/km^{2} (103/sq mi)
- Time zone: UTC+1 (CET)
  - Summer (DST): UTC+2 (CEST)
- Postal code: 38010
- Dialing code: 0461
- Website: Official website

Sporminore (Sporpìcol, Sporpìzol or Sporpìciol in local dialect) is a comune (municipality) in Trentino in the northern Italian region Trentino-Alto Adige/Südtirol, located about 20 kilometres (12 mi) northwest of Trento. As of 31 December 2004, it had a population of 695 and an area of 17.5 square kilometres (6.8 mi^{2}).

Sporminore borders the following municipalities: Ton, Campodenno and Spormaggiore.

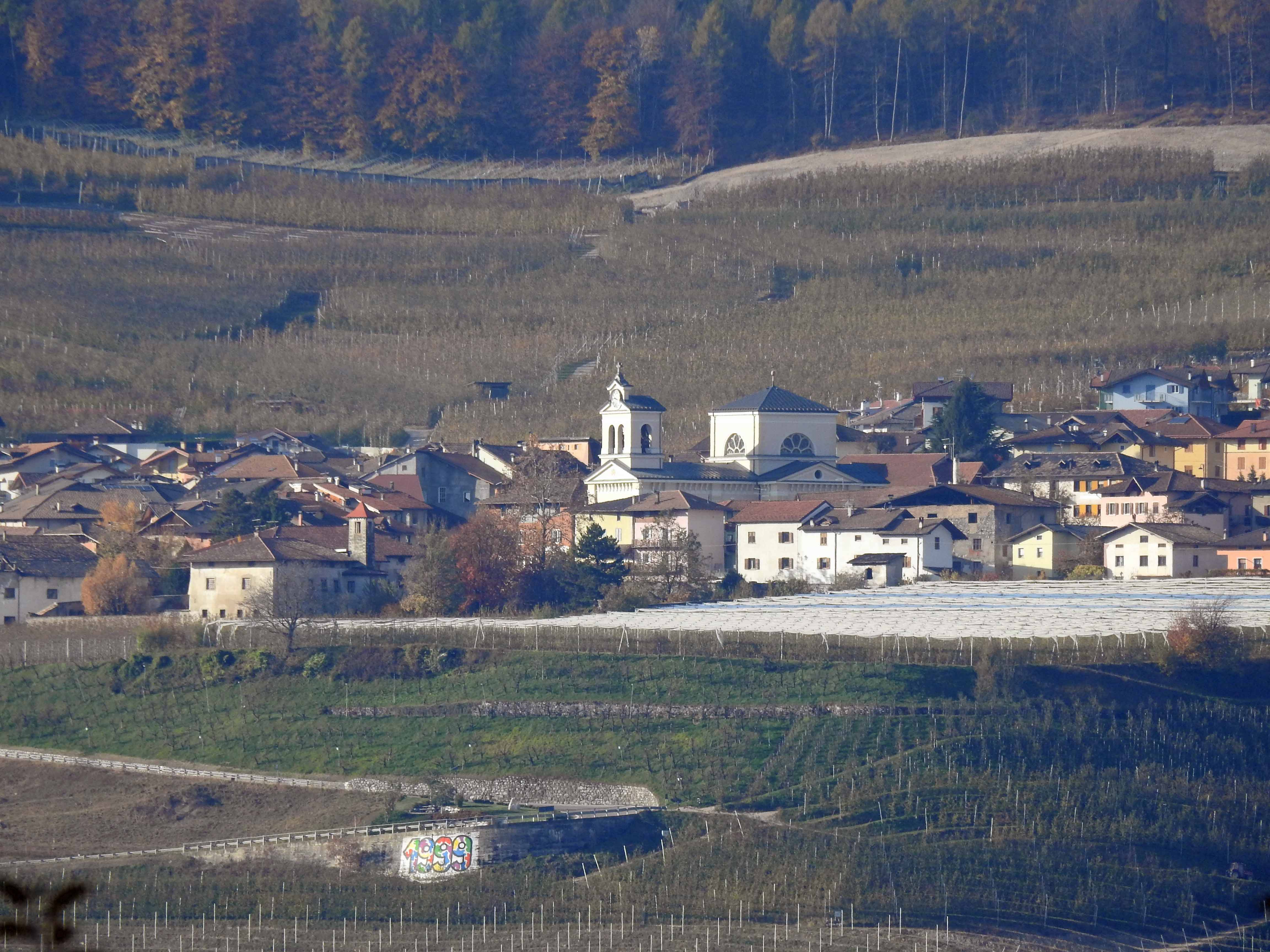
the town of Sporminore

== Demographic evolution ==
Historical population

Year	Pop.	±%
1861	?	—
1871	?	—
1881	?	—
1901	?	—
1911	?	—

Year	Pop.	±%
1921	773	—
1931	807	+4.4%
1936	783	−3.0%
1951	870	+11.1%
1961	802	−7.8%

Year	Pop.	±%
1971	692	−13.7%
1981	686	−0.9%
1991	653	−4.8%
2001	680	+4.1%

Source: Data from ISTAT
