= Elisabetta Conci =

Italian politician (1895–1965)

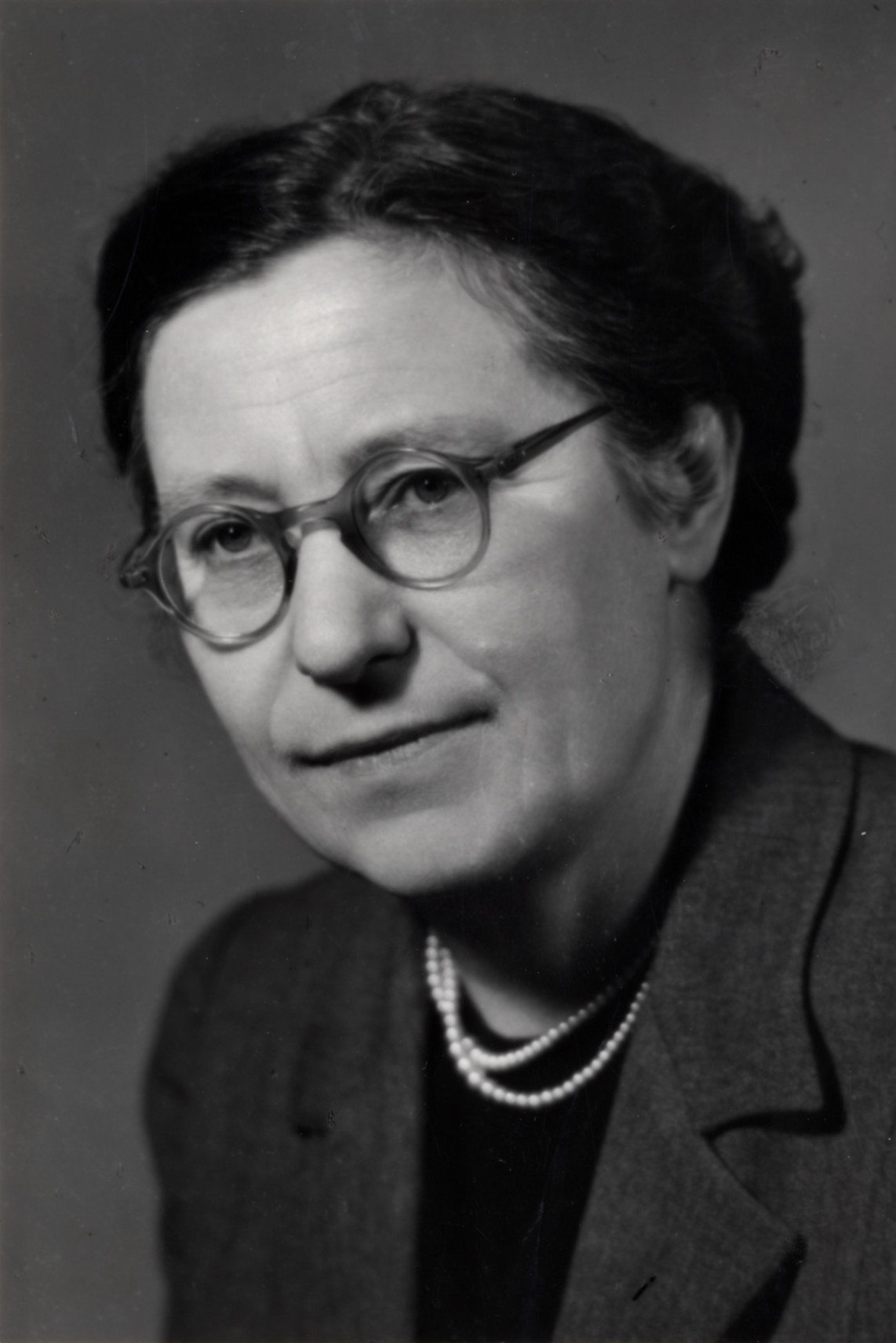
- Official portrait, 1948

Member of the Chamber of Deputies
- In office 1948–1965
- Constituency: Trento

Member of the Constituent Assembly
- In office 1946–1948
- Constituency: Trento

Personal details
- Born: 23 March 1895 Trento, Austria-Hungary
- Died: 1 November 1965 (aged 70) Mollaro, Italy
- Party: Christian Democracy
- Occupation: Schoolteacher; politician

Elisabetta "Elsa'" Conci (23 March 1895 – 1 November 1965) was an Italian politician. She was elected to the Constituent Assembly in 1946 as one of the first group of women parliamentarians in Italy. In 1948 she was elected to the Chamber of Deputies, which she remained a member of until her death.

== Biography ==
Conci was born in Trento in Austria-Hungary in 1895, the oldest of five daughters of Maria Sandri, a piano teacher, and Enrico Conci, who served as a member of the Austrian House of Deputies from 1897 until 1917. She was educated at the Ursulines girl's high school in Innsbruck and graduated from a music school in piano. After joining her family, which had been confined to Linz, she and her sister Amelia were put on trial for irredentism in 1915. However, she was freed of an amnesty granted after the death of Emperor Franz Joseph I before she could be sentenced.

She subsequently attended the University of Vienna until 1918 and then transferred to the Sapienza University of Rome, where she became a member of the Italian Catholic Federation of University Students, chairing the Rome branch. She graduated with a literature degree in 1920 and became a German teacher at the Leonardo da Vinci Lower Technical Institute in Trento, which had become part of Italy in 1919 (after which her father had become a Senator in the Italian parliament). She became involved in welfare activities, providing afterschool services for poor children. In 1933 she joined the Trento women's fascist organisation, although she was critical of the government and racial laws.

Following World War II Conci joined Christian Democracy. She was a candidate for the party in Trento in the 1946 elections (placed second behind party leader Alcide De Gasperi) and was one of 21 women elected. She was re-elected in the 1948 elections, which also saw her father elected to the Senate. She was re-elected again in 1953, 1958 and 1963. She was also part of the Italian delegation to the European Parliament.

After falling ill in May 1965, she retired to her home in Mollaro in the Non Valley, where she died in November.
