= Cunevo =

Frazione of Contà, Trentino, Italy

- Frazione
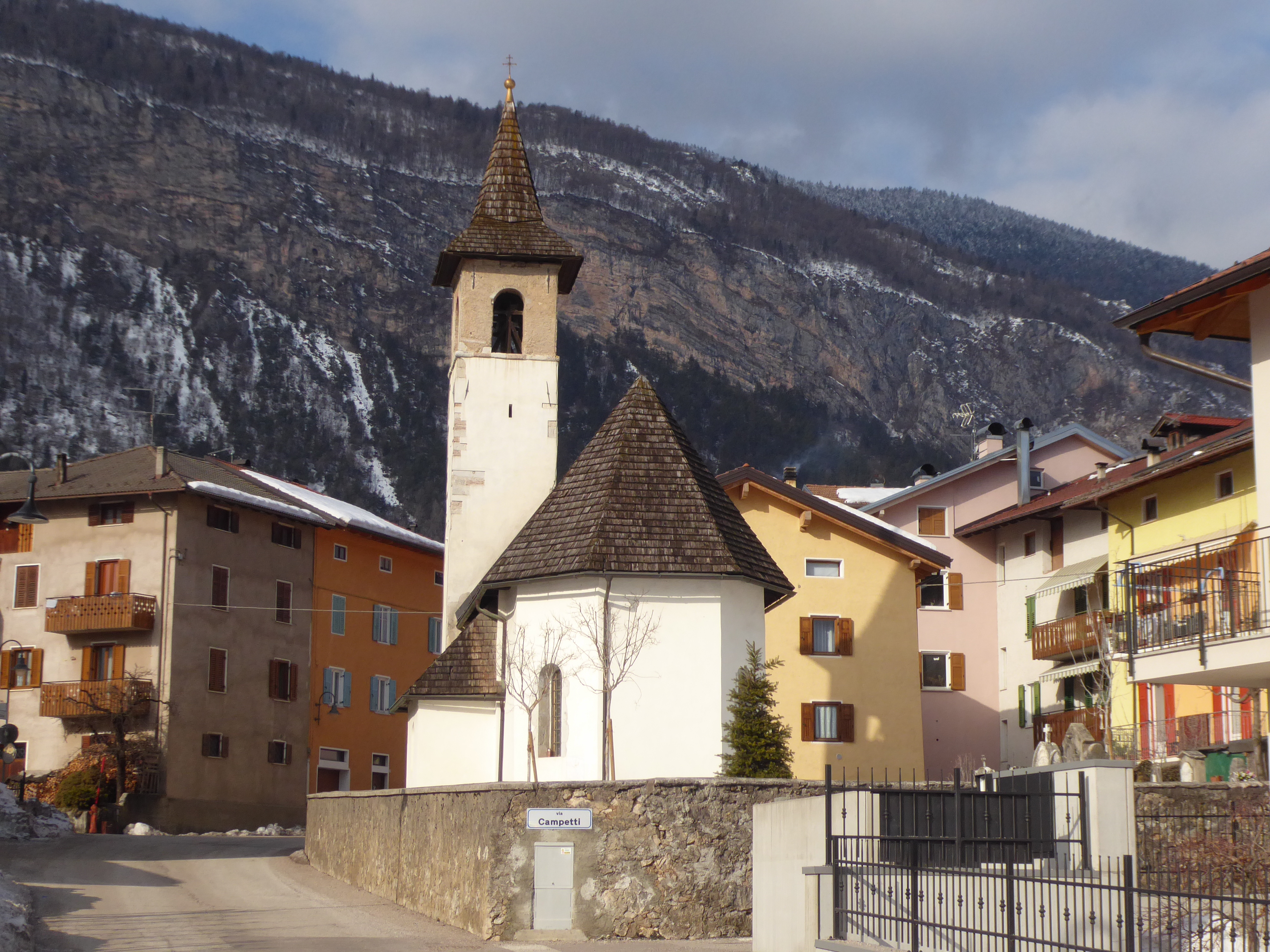

- Location of Cunevo in Italy
- Coordinates: 46°17′N 11°2′E
- Country: Italy
- Region: Trentino-Alto Adige/Südtirol
- Province: Trentino (TN)

Area
  - Total: 5.6 km^{2} (2.2 sq mi)
- Elevation: 575 m (1,886 ft)

Population (2015)
  - Total: 602
  - Density: 110/km^{2} (280/sq mi)
- Time zone: UTC+1 (CET)
  - Summer (DST): UTC+2 (CEST)
- Postal code: 38010
- Dialing code: 0461
- Website: Official website

Cunevo (German: Kuen, Ladin: Cunéo or Cunéu) is a frazione of the comune (municipality) of Contà in Trentino in the northern Italian region Trentino-Alto Adige/Südtirol, located about 25 kilometres (16 mi) north of Trento. It was an independent commune until 1 January 2016.
