= Predaia =

- Comune
- Comune di Predaia
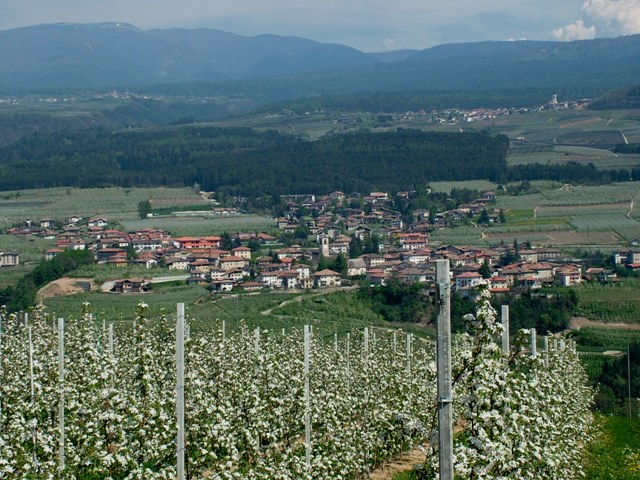
- View of Taio, the municipal seat.

- Location within Italy Location within Trentino-Alto Adige/Südtirol
- Coordinates: 46°19′24.24″N 11°04′23.16″E
- Country: Italy
- Region: Trentino-Alto Adige/Südtirol
- Province: Trento (TN)
- Frazioni: Coredo, Dardine, Dermulo, Mollaro, Priò, Segno, Smarano, Taio (municipal seat), Tavon, Torra, Tres, Tuenetto, Vervò, Vion

Government
  - Mayor: Giuliana Cova

Area
  - Total: 80.5 km^{2} (31.1 sq mi)
- Elevation: 515 m (1,690 ft)

Population (30 June 2017)
  - Total: 6,644
  - Density: 82.5/km^{2} (214/sq mi)
- Time zone: UTC+1 (CET)
  - Summer (DST): UTC+2 (CEST)
- Postal code: 38012
- Dialing code: 0463
- Website: Official website

Predaia is a comune in the northern Italian province of Trento of the Trentino Alto Adige region. It was created on 1 January 2015 after the merger of the communes of Coredo, Smarano, Taio, Tres and Vervò.

== Notable people ==
- Eusebio Kino, Jesuit missionary in North America, born in the village of Segno (formerly part of Taio)

== Twin towns ==
- Heroldsberg, Germany, since 1996
- Magdalena de Kino, Mexico
