= Smarano =

Mountain in Italy

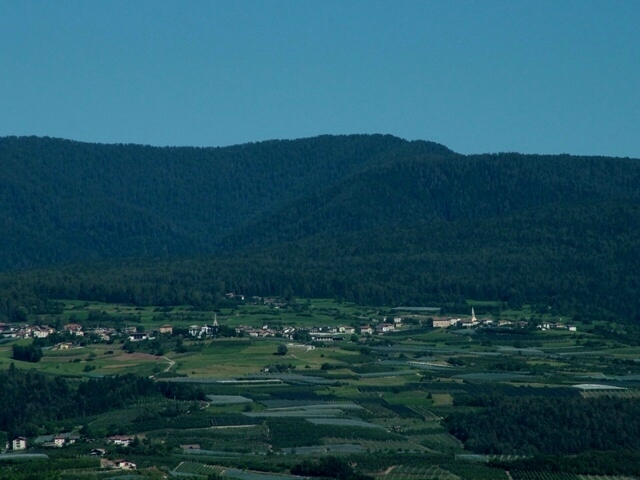

Smarano (Nones: Smaràn) was a comune (municipality) in Trentino in the northern Italian region Trentino-Alto Adige/Südtirol, located about 30 kilometres (19 mi) north of Trento. It was merged with Coredo, Taio, Tres and Vervò on January 1, 2015, to form a new municipality, Predaia.
