= Tassullo =

fraz.Tassullo - Ville d'Anaunia
- Comune
- Tassullo fraz. di Ville d'Anaunia
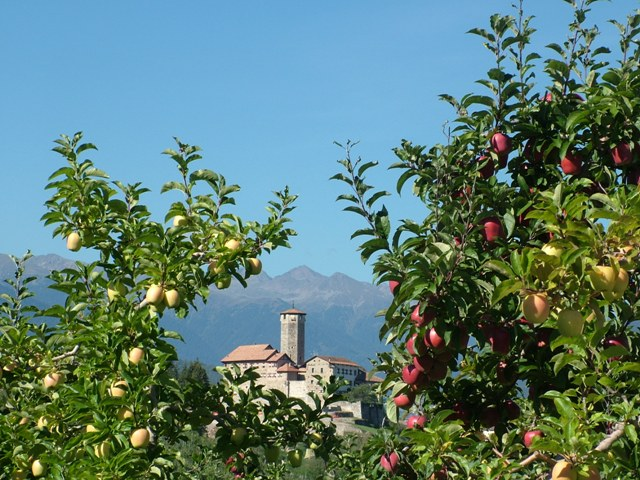
- Castel Valer (Castello di Tassullo)

- Location within Italy Location within Trentino-Alto Adige/Südtirol
- Coordinates: 46°20′N 11°3′E
- Country: Italy
- Region: Trentino-Alto Adige/Südtirol
- Province: Trentino (TN)

Area
  - Total: 13.5 km^{2} (5.2 sq mi)
- Elevation: 546 m (1,791 ft)

Population (2004)
  - Total: 1,856
  - Density: 137/km^{2} (356/sq mi)
- Time zone: UTC+1 (CET)
  - Summer (DST): UTC+2 (CEST)
- Postal code: 38010
- Dialing code: 0463
- Website: Official website

Tassullo (Ladin: Tasul, German: Tassul) is a frazione of the municipality of Ville d'Anaunia (municipality) in Trentino in the northern Italian region Trentino-Alto Adige/Südtirol, located about 42 kilometres (26 mi) north of Trento. As of 31 December 2004, it had a population of 1,856 and an area of 13.5 square kilometres (5.2 mi^{2}).

The municipality of Ville d'Anaunia contains the frazioni (subdivisions, mainly villages and hamlets) Rallo, Sanzenone, Pavillo, Tassullo, Campo, Tuenno, Nanno and Portolo.

Tassullo borders the following municipalities: Sanzeno and Cles.

== Demographic evolution ==
Historical population

Year	Pop.	±% p.a.
1861		—
1871		—
1881		—
1901		—
1911		—
1921	1,542	—
1931	1,600	+0.37%

Year	Pop.	±% p.a.
1936	1,671	+0.87%
1951	1,885	+0.81%
1961	1,956	+0.37%
1971	1,949	−0.04%
1981	1,805	−0.76%
1991	1,773	−0.18%
2001	1,790	+0.10%
