= Coredo =

Former municipality and frazione of the comune of Predaia, Italy

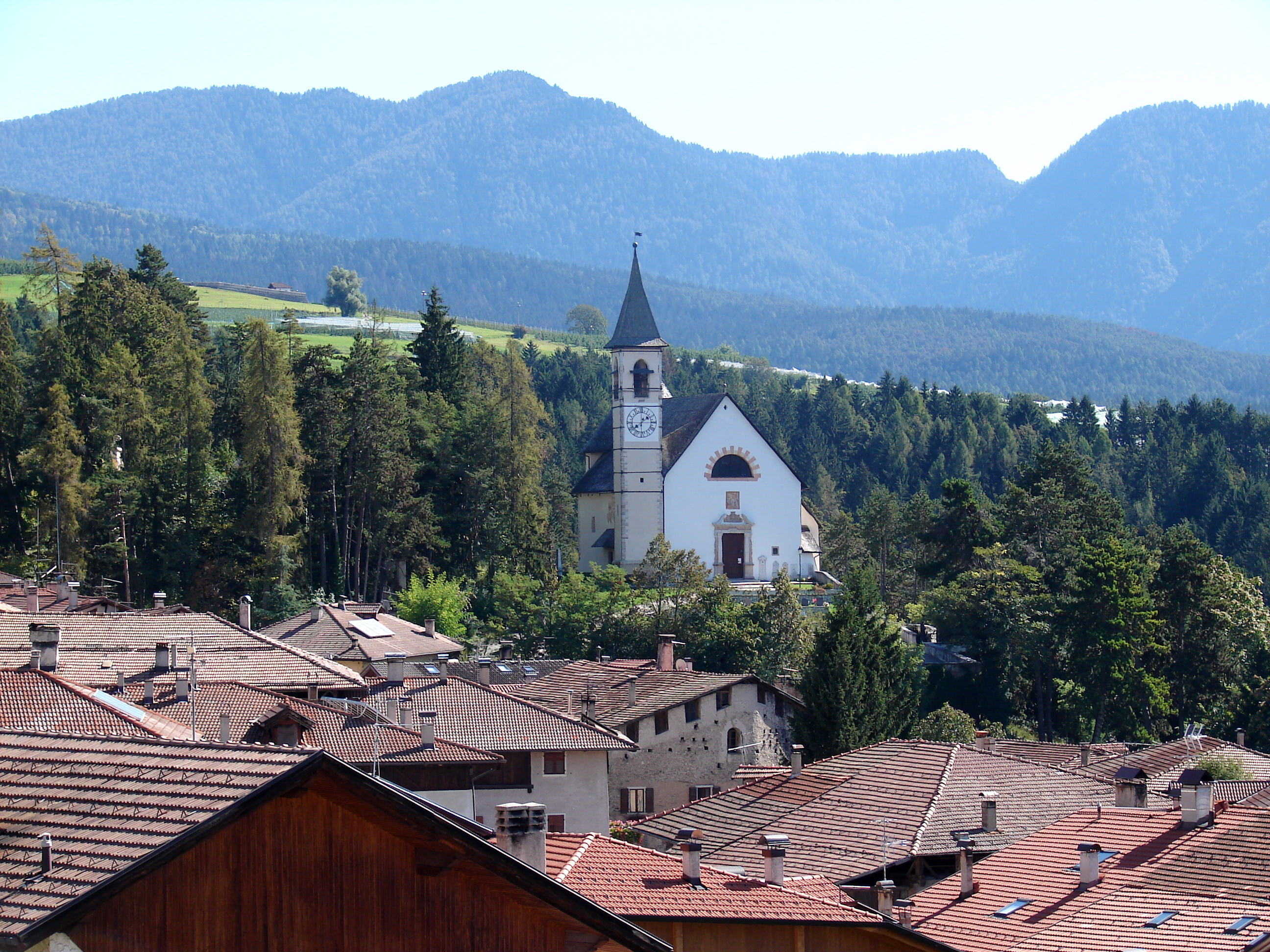
View on the church of Ritrovamento della Croce in Coredo

Coredo (German: Koreth; Nones: Còret) was a comune (municipality) in Trentino in the northern Italian region Trentino-Alto Adige/Südtirol, located about 30 kilometres (19 mi) north of Trento. It was merged with Smarano, Taio, Tres and Vervò on January 1, 2015, to form a new municipality, Predaia.

== Gallery ==
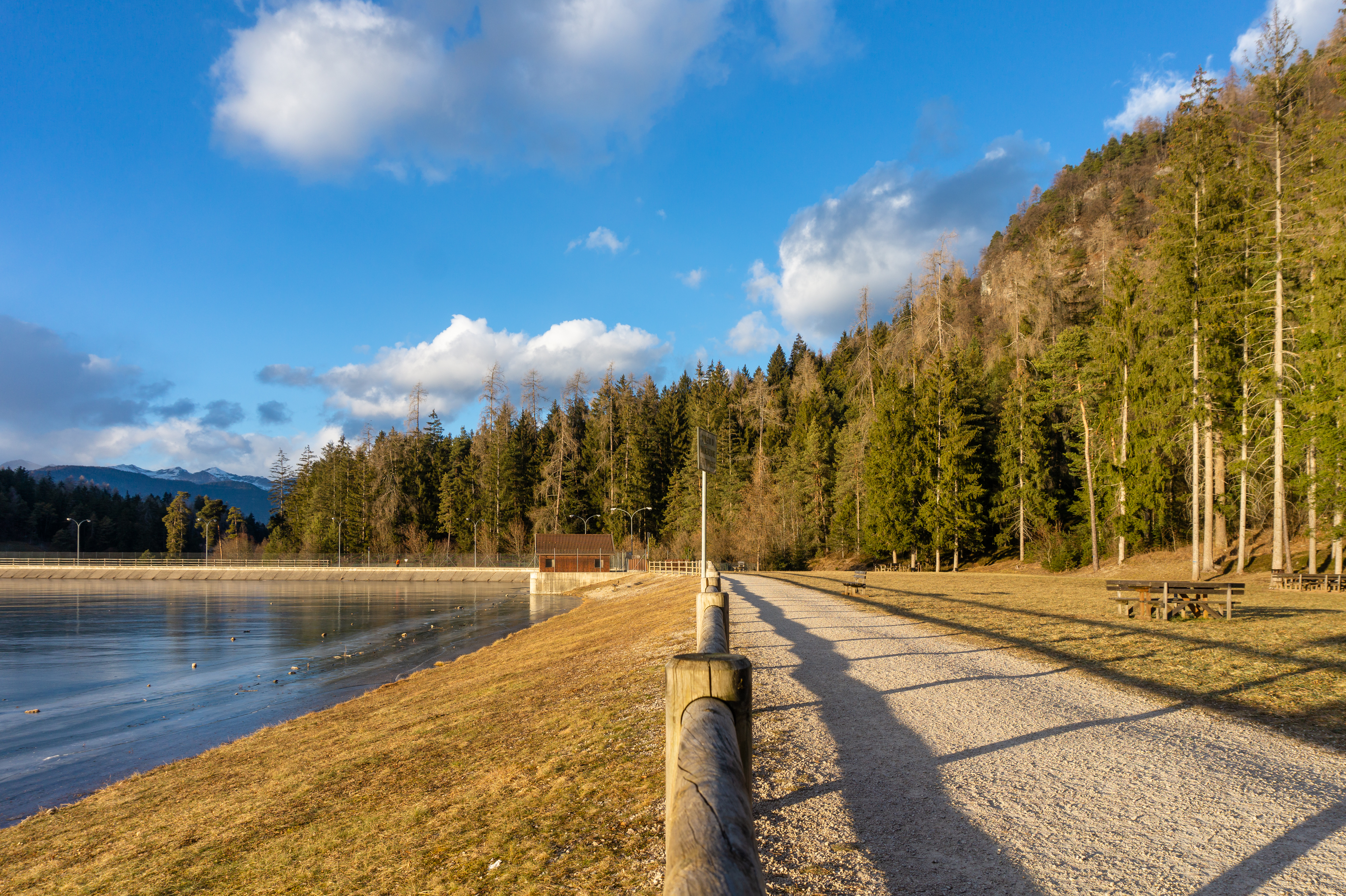
Lake Coredo with its surrounding forest

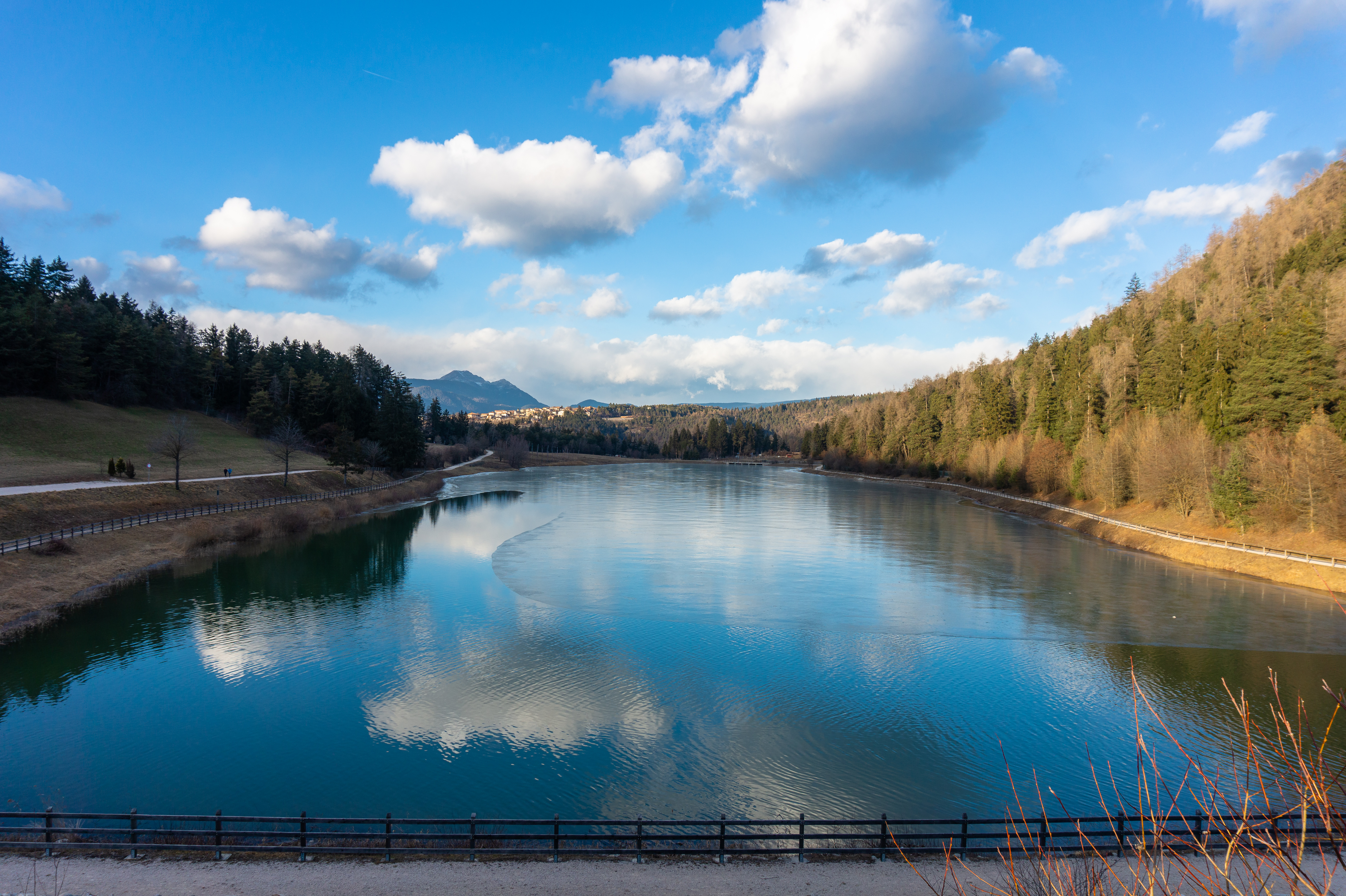
Lake Tavon, on the opposite side
