= Terres =

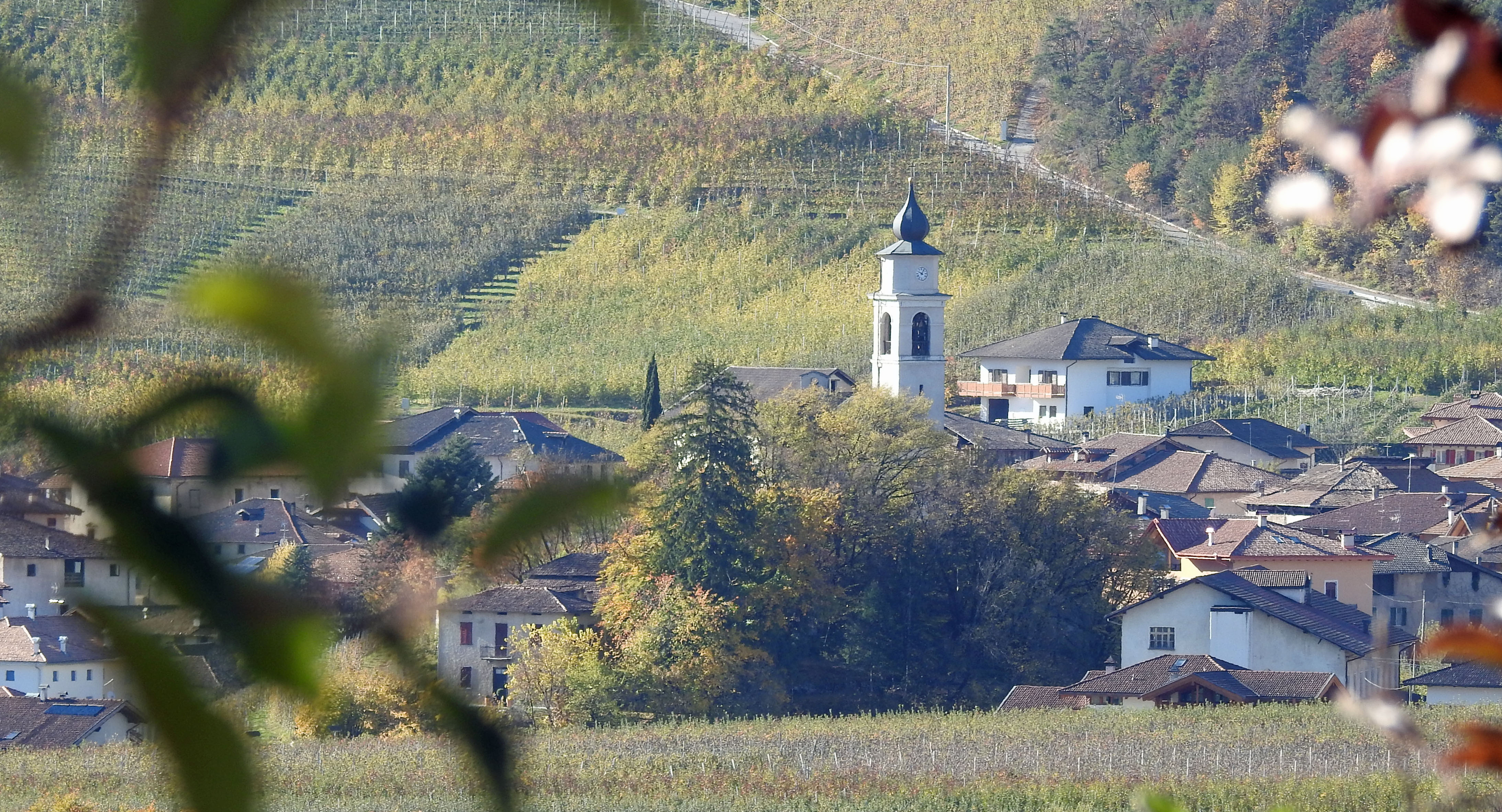

Terres is a frazione of the comune (municipality) of Contà in Trentino in the northern Italian region Trentino-Alto Adige/Südtirol, located about 25 kilometres (16 mi) north of Trento. It was an independent commune until 1 January 2016.
