= Flavon =

- Frazione
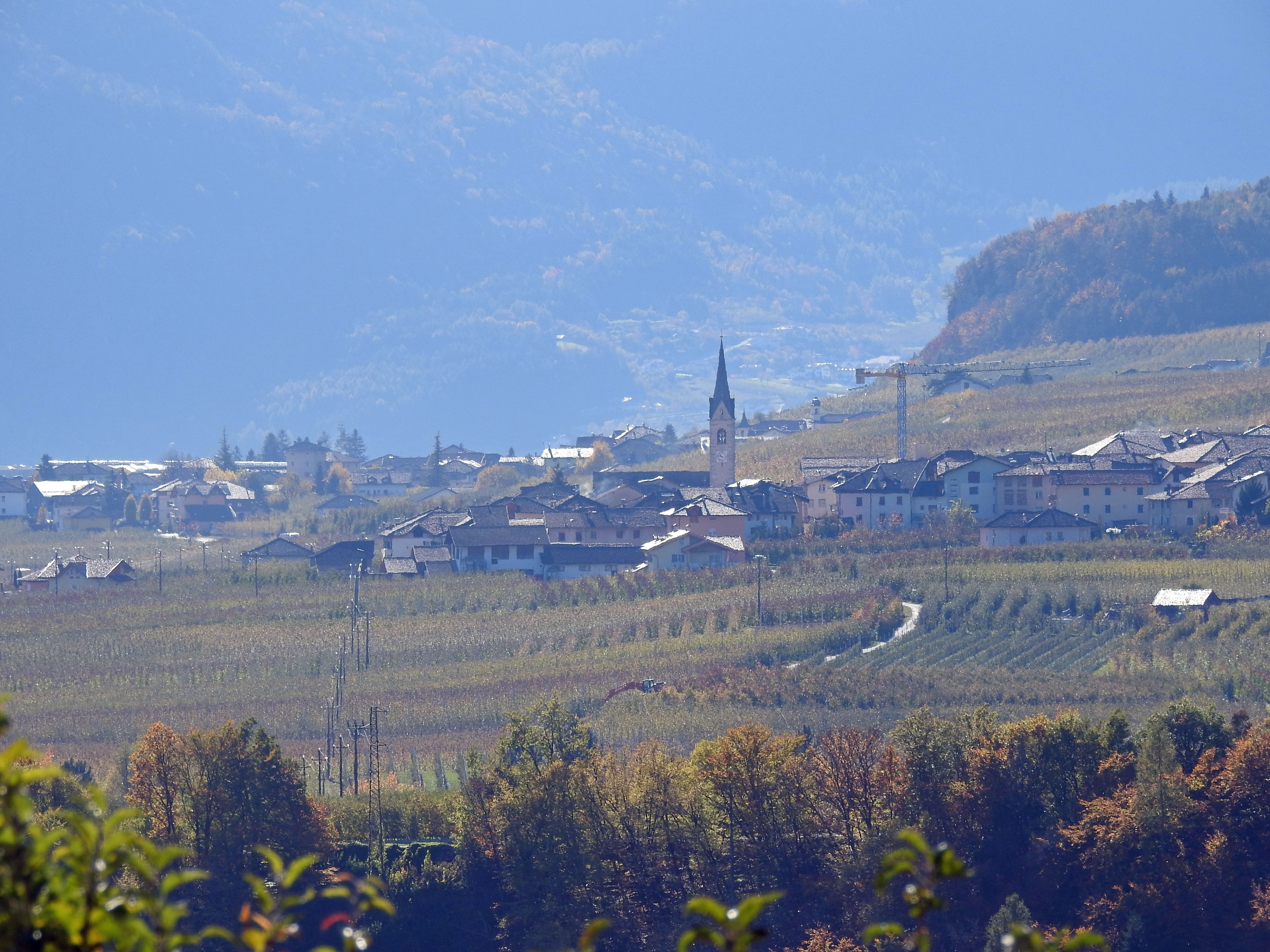
- Interactive map of Flavon
- Country: Italy
- Region: Trentino-South Tyrol
- Province: Trentino
- Comune: Contà

Area
  - Total: 7.58 km^{2} (2.93 sq mi)
- Elevation: 575 m (1,886 ft)

Population (2015)
  - Total: 532
  - Density: 70.2/km^{2} (182/sq mi)
- Demonym(s): flavonesi; i flaóni
- Time zone: UTC+1 (CET)
- Postal code: 38093 (formerly 38010)
- Area code: 0461
- Vehicle registration: TN
- Seismic classification: Zone 4 (very low risk)

Flavon is a frazione of the comune (municipality) of Contà in Trentino in the northern Italian region Trentino-Alto Adige/Südtirol, located about 25 kilometres (16 mi) north of Trento. It was an independent commune until 1 January 2016.
