= Denno =

- Comune
- Comune di Denno
- Location within Italy Location within Trentino-Alto Adige/Südtirol
- Coordinates: 46°17′N 11°3′E
- Country: Italy
- Region: Trentino-Alto Adige/Südtirol
- Province: Trentino (TN)

Government
  - Mayor: Paolo Vielmetti

Area
  - Total: 10 km^{2} (3.9 sq mi)

Population (2026)
  - Total: 1,246
  - Density: 120/km^{2} (320/sq mi)
- Demonym: dennesi
- Time zone: UTC+1 (CET)
  - Summer (DST): UTC+2 (CEST)
- Postal code: 38010
- Dialing code: 0461
- Patron saint: Saints Gervasius and Protasius
- Saint day: 19 June
- Website: Official website

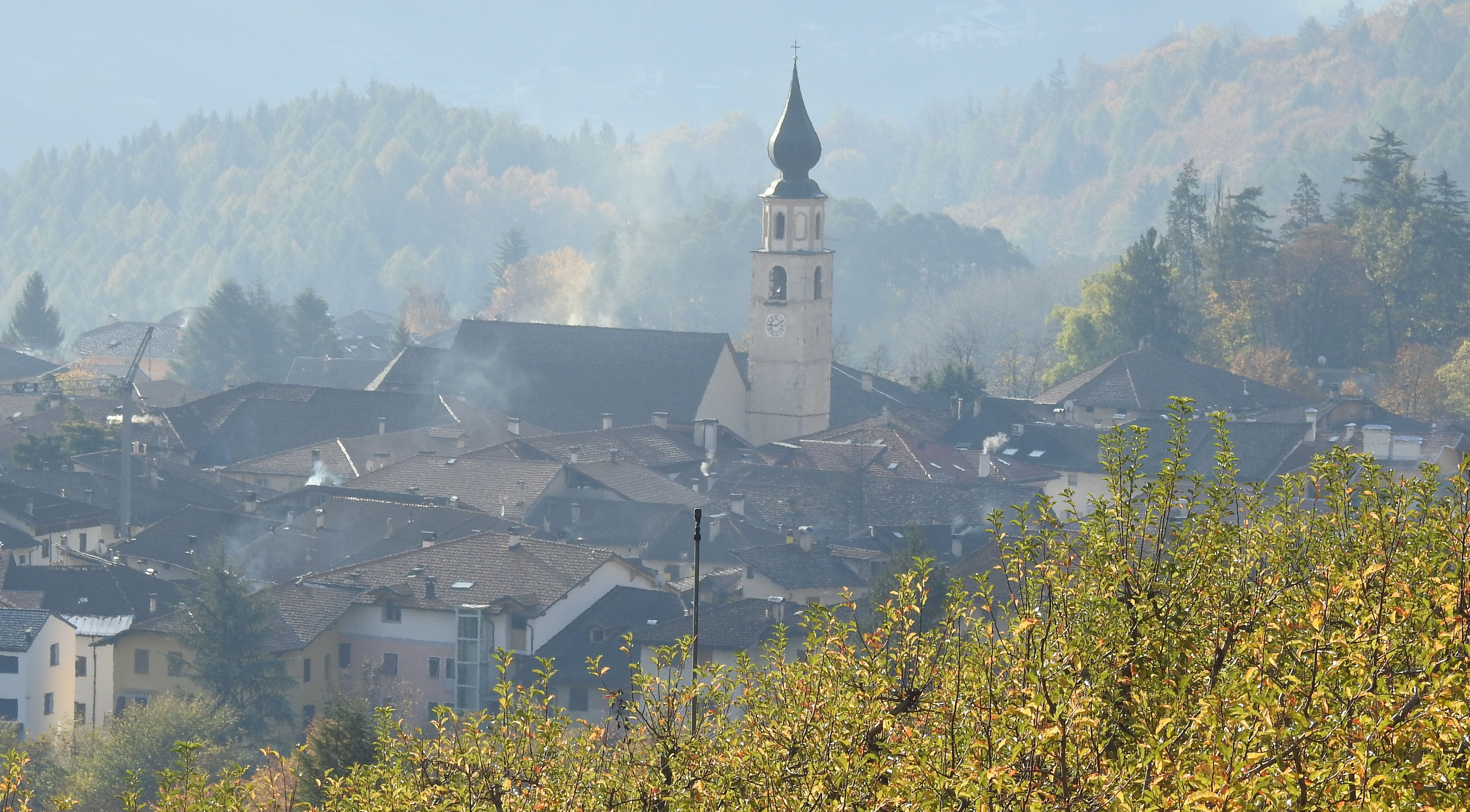
the town of Denno

Denno (Dén in local dialect) is a comune in Trentino, northern Italy.

== Geography ==
It located on a terrace between the Rio Pleggio valley and the valley descending from Termon, on the eastern slopes of the Campa mountains.
