= Art collection of Fondazione Cassa di Risparmio di Fano =

Coordinates: 43°50′39″N 13°01′03″E

The Quadreria della Fondazione Cassa di Risparmio di Fano (Gallery of the Foundation of Fano Saving Bank) houses a notable collection of Italian paintings from the 1600-1900s, collected over the last forty years by Cassa di Risparmio di Fano (which now transferred to the holding entity – the Fondazione). It is located in the Salone del Consiglio of the financial institution, formerly the Case dei Malatesti, in the city of Fano, Marche.

The painting gallery is open to the public by pre-arranged guided tour. The collection contains the following paintings from before the 19th century:

== Collection ==
=== Quadreria ===
Painter	Lifespan	Work
Guercino	(1591–1666)	Marriage of the Virgin
Giovanni Francesco Guerrieri	(1589–1657)	Vision of San Carlo Borromeo
Giovanni Francesco Guerrieri		St. Mary Magdalen penitent
Giovanni Francesco Guerrieri		Cleopatra
Giovanni Francesco Guerrieri		The miracle of bread and fishes
Giovanni Francesco Guerrieri		
Lorenzo Garbieri	(1580–1654)	St. Jerome and the Angel
Simone Cantarini	(1612–1648)	Hagar and Ishmael
Simone Cantarini	(1612–1648)	Madonna of the Rose
Simone Cantarini		Madonna and child with St Thomas and Jerome’’
Carlo Magini	(1720–1806)	Still life with table cloth and meal
Carlo Magini		Still life with two pink onions, cauliflower, cheese, and cup
Carlo Magini		Still-life with bowls, plates, and oil
Carlo Magini		Still life with meal with frittata and bread
Carlo Magini		Portrait of Innocezo Zambelli
Gaetano Lapis	(1706–1773)	San Giovanni of Capistrano
Francesco Mancini	(1679–1758)	Holy Family
Sebastiano Ceccarini	(1703–1783)	Man and woman playing allegory of Vertumnus and Pomona
Sebastiano Ceccarini		Portrait of noblewoman
Sebastiano Ceccarini		Madonna of the Rosary

=== Pinacoteca San Domenico ===
Many of the sacred works and former altarpieces are since 2013 on display in the restored but deconsecrated church of San Domenico.

== Sources ==
- Homepage
