= Mondolfo =

- Comune
- Comune di Mondolfo
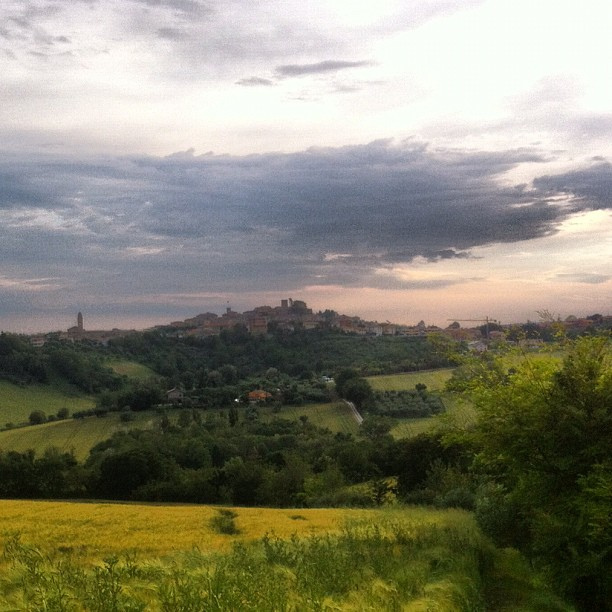
- View of Mondolfo

- Mondolfo within the Province of Pesaro-Urbino

- Location within Italy Location within Marche
- Coordinates: 43°45′N 13°6′E
- Country: Italy
- Region: Marche
- Province: Pesaro e Urbino (PU)
- Frazioni: Marotta, Molino Vecchio, Ponterio, Sterpettine, Centocroci, Valle del Pozzo

Area
  - Total: 22.82 km^{2} (8.81 sq mi)
- Elevation: 144 m (472 ft)

Population (31 December 2017)
  - Total: 14,280
  - Density: 625.8/km^{2} (1,621/sq mi)
- Demonym: Mondolfesi
- Time zone: UTC+1 (CET)
  - Summer (DST): UTC+2 (CEST)
- Postal code: 61037
- Dialing code: 0721
- Website: Official website

Mondolfo is a comune (municipality) in the Province of Pesaro e Urbino in the Italian region Marche, located about 35 kilometres (22 mi) northwest of Ancona and about 25 kilometres (16 mi) southeast of Pesaro, on the Adriatic Sea.

Mondolfo borders the following municipalities: Castel Colonna, Fano, San Costanzo, Senigallia, Trecastelli. It is one of I Borghi più belli d'Italia ("The most beautiful villages of Italy").

== History ==
Human presence is testified by remains from as early as the Neolithic Age. However, the first stable settlement appeared starting from the early 11th century, around a Byzantine castle existing here in the 6th-7th centuries.

== Main sights ==
- Church of San Gervasio
- Sant'Agostino church (1586–93) and convent (17th century)
- Santa Giustina church (completed around 1760)
- San Sebastiano (1479), housing the Ceccarini altarpiece
- Church of San Giovanni (17th century)
- Palazzo Giraldi Della Rovere (16th century)
- Palazzo Peruzzi (16th century)
- Sanctuary of the Madonna delle Grotte (1682)

== Notable people ==
- Filippo Sorcinelli (born 1975), fashion designer
