= Fano Cathedral =

Cathedral in Marche, Italy

Coordinates: 43.8435°N 13.0157°E

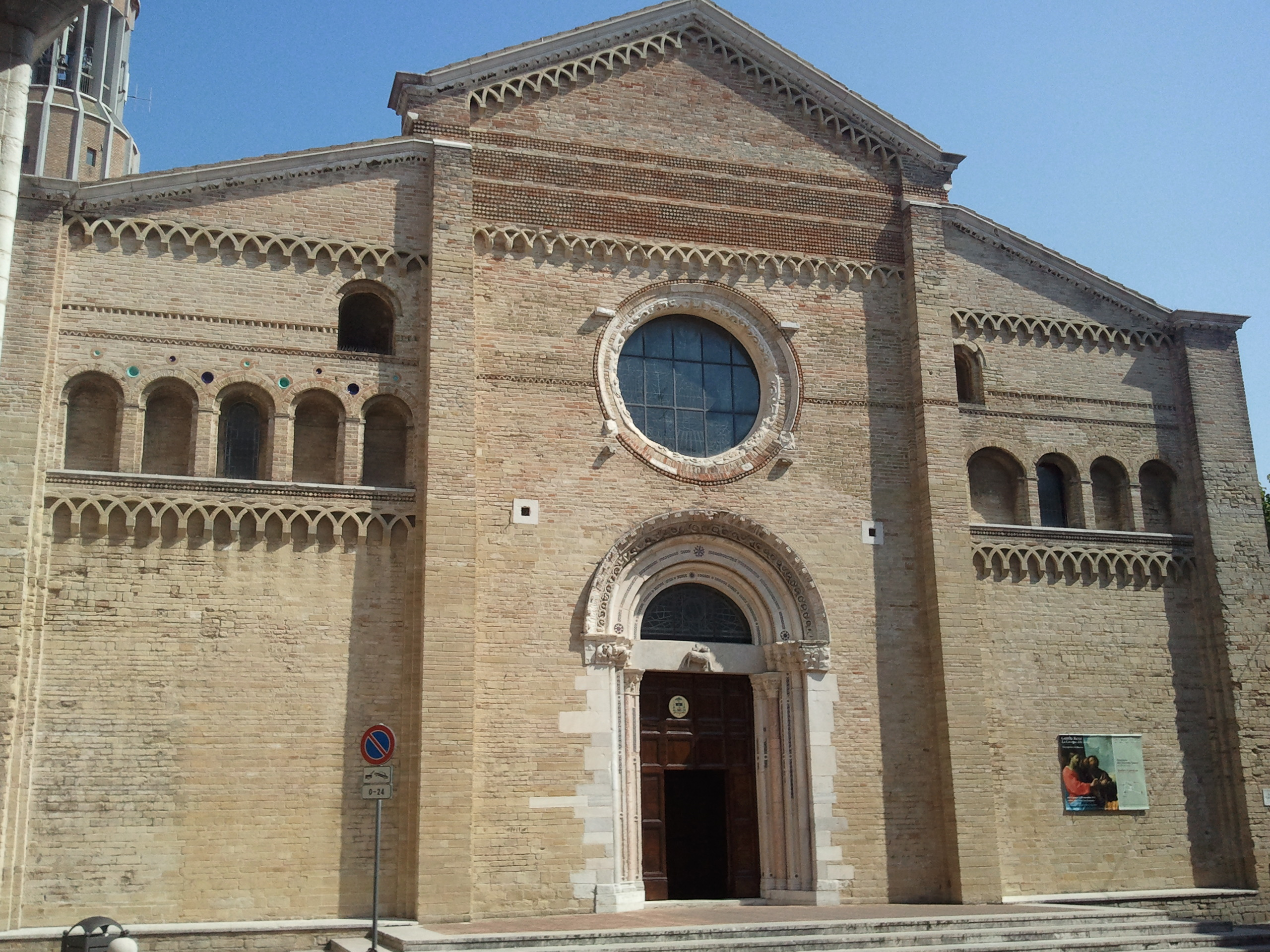
Fano Cathedral west front

Fano Cathedral (Italian: Basilica cattedrale di Santa Maria Assunta; Cattedrale di Fano; also called Santa Maria Maggiore) is the principal church of Fano, Marche, Italy. Originally the seat of the bishop of Fano, since 1986 it has been the episcopal seat of the Diocese of Fano-Fossombrone-Cagli-Pergola. In January 1953 Pope Pius XII elevated it to the rank of a basilica minor.

== History ==
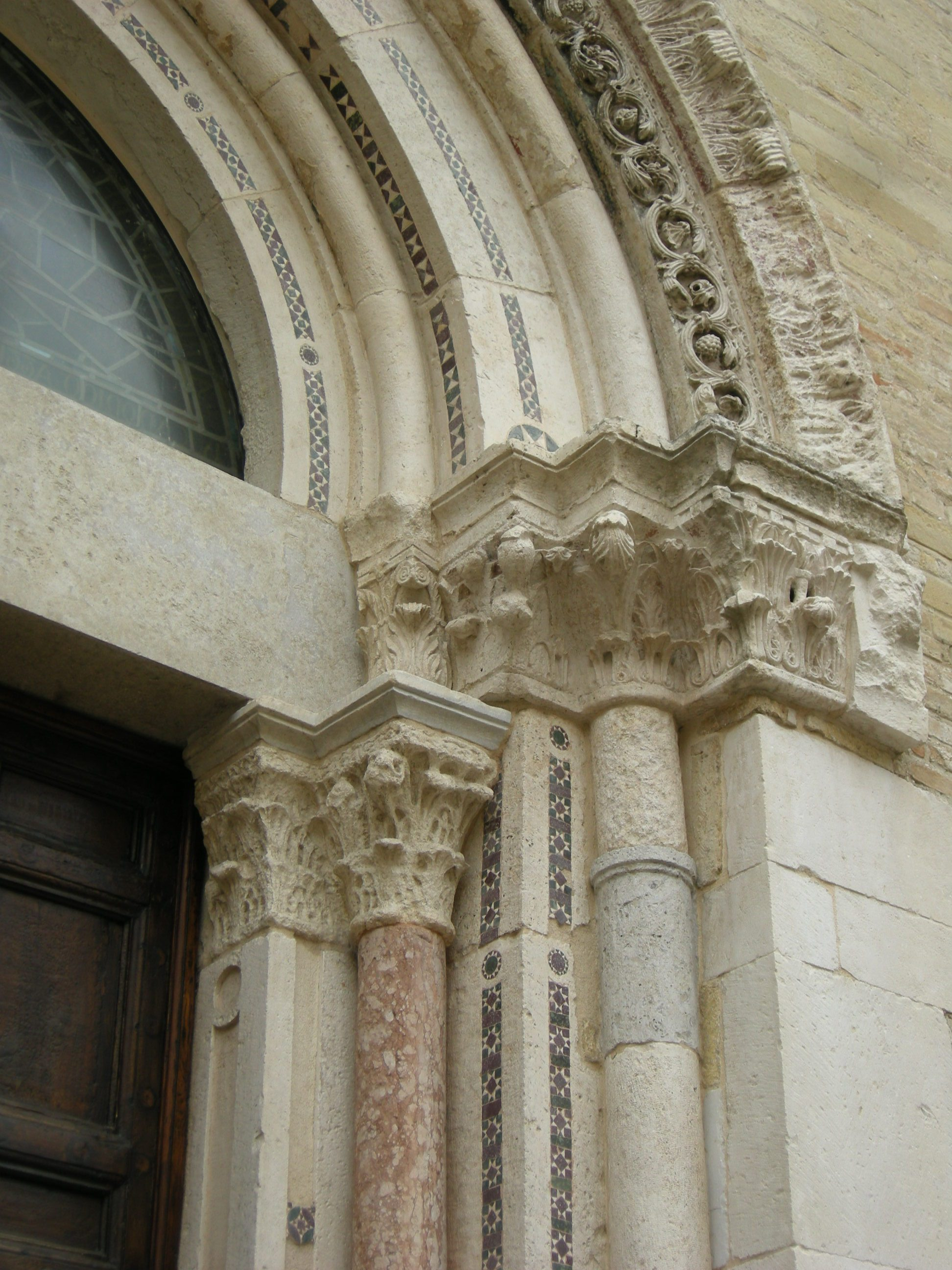
Detail of the portal

The present cathedral was constructed in the 12th century in the Romanesque style in place of an earlier church destroyed by fire in 1124, which, by virtue of being the largest church in Fano, was called Santa Maria la maggiore. The destruction of this early church is attested by a stone in the present cathedral; set in the wall below the organ, it reports that after the old building was destroyed in a fire, under Bishop Rainaldo (1136–1159) the new cathedral was built by the hand of mastro Rainerio. It is presumed that the new building was consecrated around 1140.

The new structure had three naves or aisles terminating in three apses, with a crypt beneath the presbytery. During the 16th century the two side apses were converted into chapels, while the central apse was enlarged. Also in this period the crypt was destroyed and the presbytery lowered. The side chapels opening off the aisles, of which eight had been built in the 14th century, were reduced to six in the 20th century by the construction of two side entrances. The bell tower is a recent construction: the previous one was demolished by the Germans during World War II. It contains five bells, cast by De Poli of Vittorio Veneto in 1965.which make up a series of Gospel episodes from the Venuta di Cristo; only the columns are modern.

== Description ==
=== Art and architecture ===
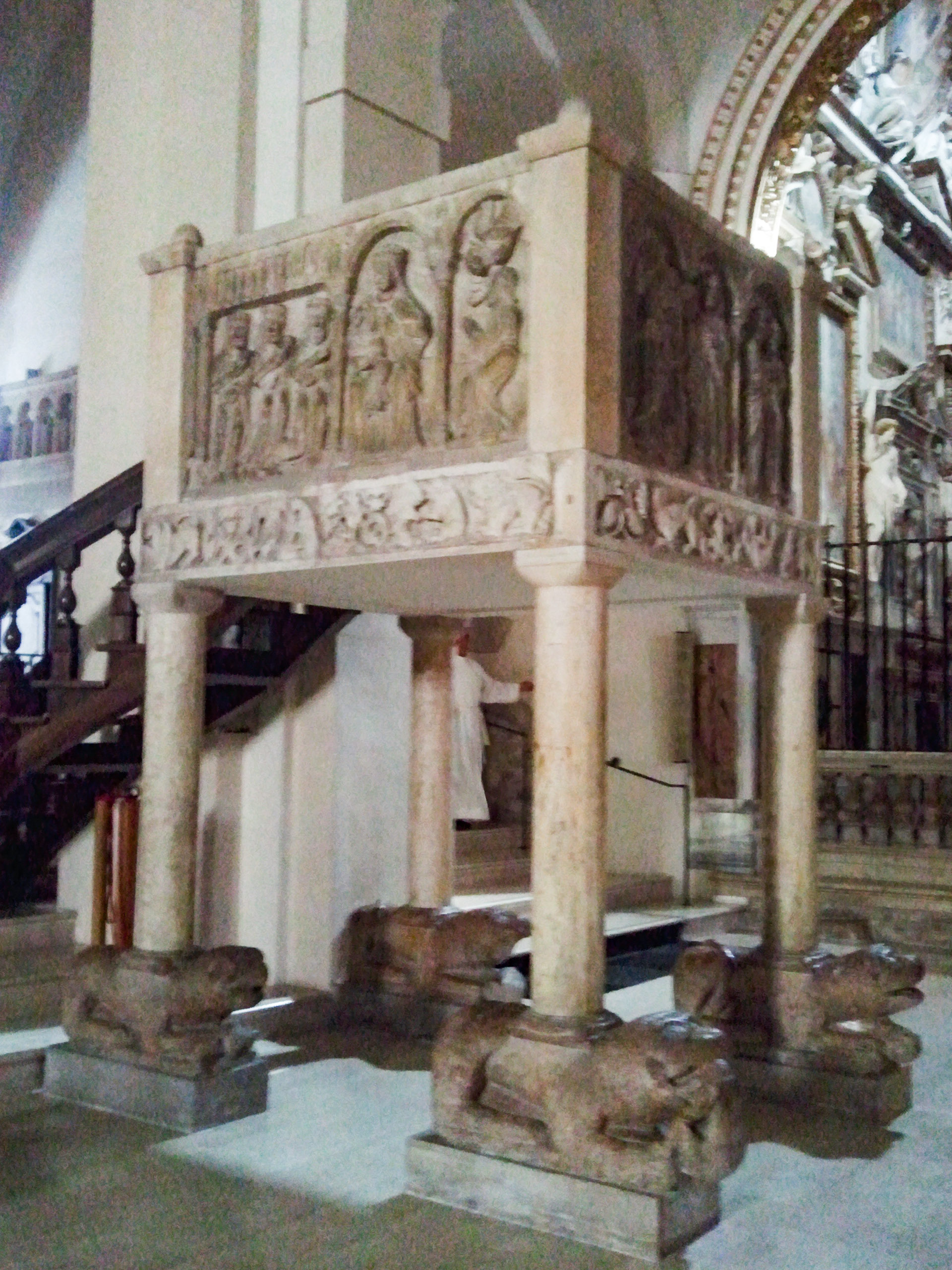
The pulpit

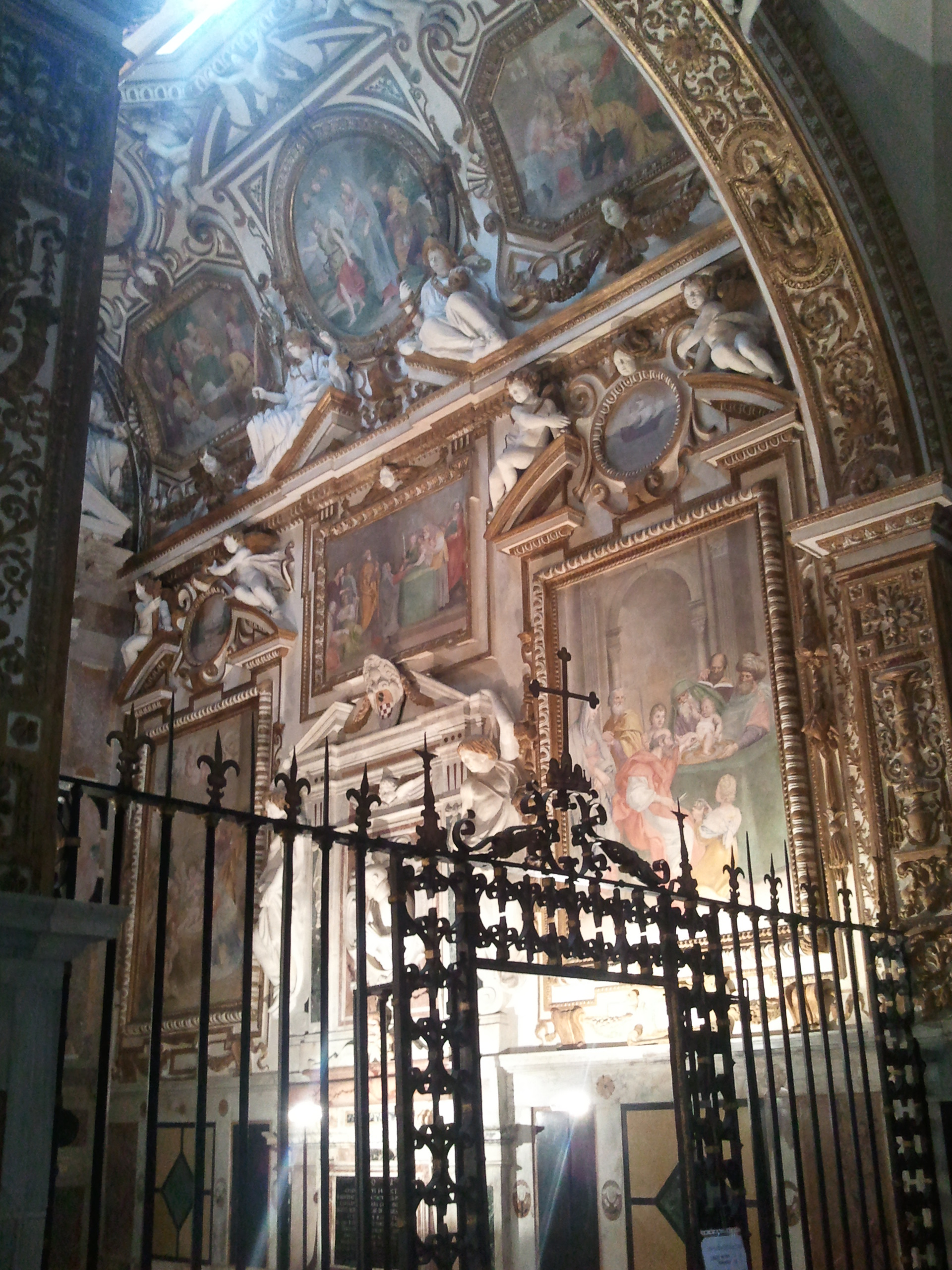
The Nolfi Chapel, 17th century

The west front is the part that has best preserved its original Romanesque structure, thanks principally to the restoration works carried out in the 1920s. It is tripartite with a pedimented façade (Italian: facciata a capanna). In the two outer sections false loggias are inserted, and in the central section is a portal beneath a round window.

The interior has three naves or aisles divided by pilasters. Of historic and artistic value is the pulpit, reassembled in the first half of the 20th century from the various elements, which had either been built into the walls in successive reuses, or scattered round the diocese for other purposes. It is composed of marble slabs with Romanesque reliefs, which make up a series of Gospel episodes from the Venuta di Cristo; only the columns are modern.

There are six side chapels, three on either side. Along the south aisle are the chapel dedicated to Saint Paul; the chapel containing the tombs of the bishops; and the more sumptuous Nolfi Chapel, so called because it was in the patronage of the local noble family of that name, and fitted out in the early 17th century in exuberant Baroque decoration. It contains important canvases by Domenichino depicting episodes from the life of the Virgin Mary. Along the north aisle are the chapels of the Crucifixion, of the Madonna Pellegrina and of the baptistery, in which was baptised on 4 March 1536 Ippolito Aldobrandini, the future Pope Clement VIII (1592–1605).

In the transept are two further chapels: in the south arm, the chapel of the Saint Protectors, dedicated to two sainted bishops of Fano, Orsus and Eusebius, shown in a canvas of 1613 by Ludovico Carracci; and in the north arm, the Neoclassical chapel of the Holy Sacrament, which has undergone various interventions over the course of the centuries, resulting principally from an earthquake in 1672, which caused part of the bell tower to collapse on it, and from the German bombardments of the last war.

In the presbytery are the high altar, which rests on the sarcophagus of Saint Fortunatus; the wooden 18th-century choir stall; and a canvas by Sebastiano Ceccarini (1750), depicting Maria assunta in cielo. To the sides are stained glass windows with representations of the protecting bishop saints of Fano: Paternianus, Eusebius, Orsus and Fortunatus.
