= Mr. Bond (disambiguation) =

Mr. Bond refers to James Bond, a literary and film character.

Mr. Bond may also refer to :

- Mr. Bond (musician), an Austrian neo-Nazi rapper
- Mr. Bond (film), a 1992 Indian Hindi action film
