= Santa Giustina (disambiguation) =

Santa Giustina may refer to:

- Santa Giustina, a comune (municipality) in the province of Belluno in the Italian region of Veneto
- Santa Giustina in Colle, a comune (municipality) in the Province of Padua in the Italian region Veneto
- Justina of Padua, saint called Santa Giustina in Italian and sometimes also in English
- Lago di Santa Giustina, a lake in Trentino, Italy

== Buildings ==
- Abbey of Santa Giustina, a 10th-century Benedictine abbey complex located in Padua
- Santa Giustina, Venice, a deconsecrated, former Roman Catholic church building in the sestiere of Castello, Venice
- Santa Giustina, Mondolfo, a collegiate and parish Roman Catholic church, located in Mondolfo, in the province of Pesaro and Urbino, region of Marche, Italy
- Santa Giustina e Sant'Agnese, a 16th-century Roman Catholic church in Tortona, Province of Alessandria, region of Piedmont, Italy
