= San Domenico, Fano =

Church in Fano, Italy

Coordinates: 43.8448°N 13.0165°E

San Domenico is a deconsecrated Roman Catholic church in the town of Fano, province of Pesaro and Urbino in the Marche, Italy. The deconsecrated church is now used to display the painting collection of the Fondazione Cassa di Risparmio di Fano. The church has been selected to display sacred works and altarpieces from the 16th and 17th centuries in an environment resembling their original placements.

== History ==
In 1216, priest of the Dominican order would arrive in Fano. The construction of an oratory occurred soon after. By the late 14th-century, a larger Gothic-style church was erected. In 1485, a bell-tower and the Chapel of the Madonna of the Rosary was erected. In 1701-1703, the interiors of that church was refurbished by the architect Francesco Gasparoli with late-baroque altars.

During World War II, the church suffered when the retreating German army razed the bell-tower. Restoration began in 2006, and the process has uncovered medieval frescoes, including some frescoes narrating the Life of St John the Baptist, attributed by some to Ottaviano Nelli or followers. The church in 1298 was also the burial site of Jacopo del Cassero, featured in Canto V of Dante's Purgatorio.

Among the canvases on display from the collection of Carifano Foundation is the famed Marriage of the Virgin by Guercino, but also canvases by Simone Cantarini, Sebastiano Ceccarini, Simone de Magistris, Giovanni Francesco Guerrieri, Federico Barocci, Palma il Giovane, Federico Zuccari, and others.
