= Sant'Agostino, Mondolfo =

Building in Mondolfo, Italy

Coordinates: 43.750336°N 13.097339°E

Sant'Agostino is a Roman Catholic church, located on Via Cavour in Mondolfo, region of Marche, Italy.

== History ==
The church and convent was initially built in 13th century, when it was located just inside the town walls, near the Porta Santa Maria, and affiliated with the Augustinian order, likely derived from the Abbey of Piaggiolino.

By 1427, Bella, the widow of Allevuccio Mencoli, and her daughter Antonia commissioned Gigliolo da Parma to paint frescoes in a chapel dedicated to St Anthony Abbot, patron of pilgrims. The church was damaged during the various conflicts in the region. In 1466, the comune funded reconstruction the church, using designs submitted by Antonio di Pietro of Vercelli, architect for Sigismondo Pandolfo Malatesta in Senigallia.

The convent flourished at the end of the 15th and start of the 16th centuries. The church was refurbished and enlarged starting in 1586 - 1593, and rededicated to the Madonna del Soccorso. Construction lasted till the end of the 18th-century. In 1726 the facade gained three elegant portals; in 1732, the chapel of San Nicola da Tolentino was built; and in 1760, the apse rebuilt.

The Chapel of St Nicola has a 17th-century canvas depicting San Nicola by an anonymous local painter and a Miracle of the Procession in time of the Plague with the Madonna and Child with Saints Nicola and Francis by Alessandro Tiarini. In the Church, a canvas depicting the Madonna della Gatta is a copy by his studio of a Federico Barocci painting. The third and fourth altarpieces (after 1621) depict St Anthony Abbot and Paul the Hermit and a Madonna and Child with St John the Baptist and John the Evangelist by Claudio Ridolfi. The fifth altar has an altarpiece depicting the Martyrdom of Saints Simon and Judas (1649) by Giovanni Francesco Guerrieri. The sixth altar on the right has 15 small canvases by an anonymous local 17th-century painter, depicting the Mysteries of the Rosary and an atavistic Byzantine 16th-century icon of the Madonna del Buon Consiglio. The church also has artworks by Girolamo Cialdieri, Giuliano Presutti, and Sebastiano Ceccarini.

One of the courtyards has frescoed lunettes (17th century) depicting the Life of St Augustine. In 2015, the convent is used for cultural activities, including a museum.
