= Filippo Sorcinelli =

Italian designer and organist (born 1975)

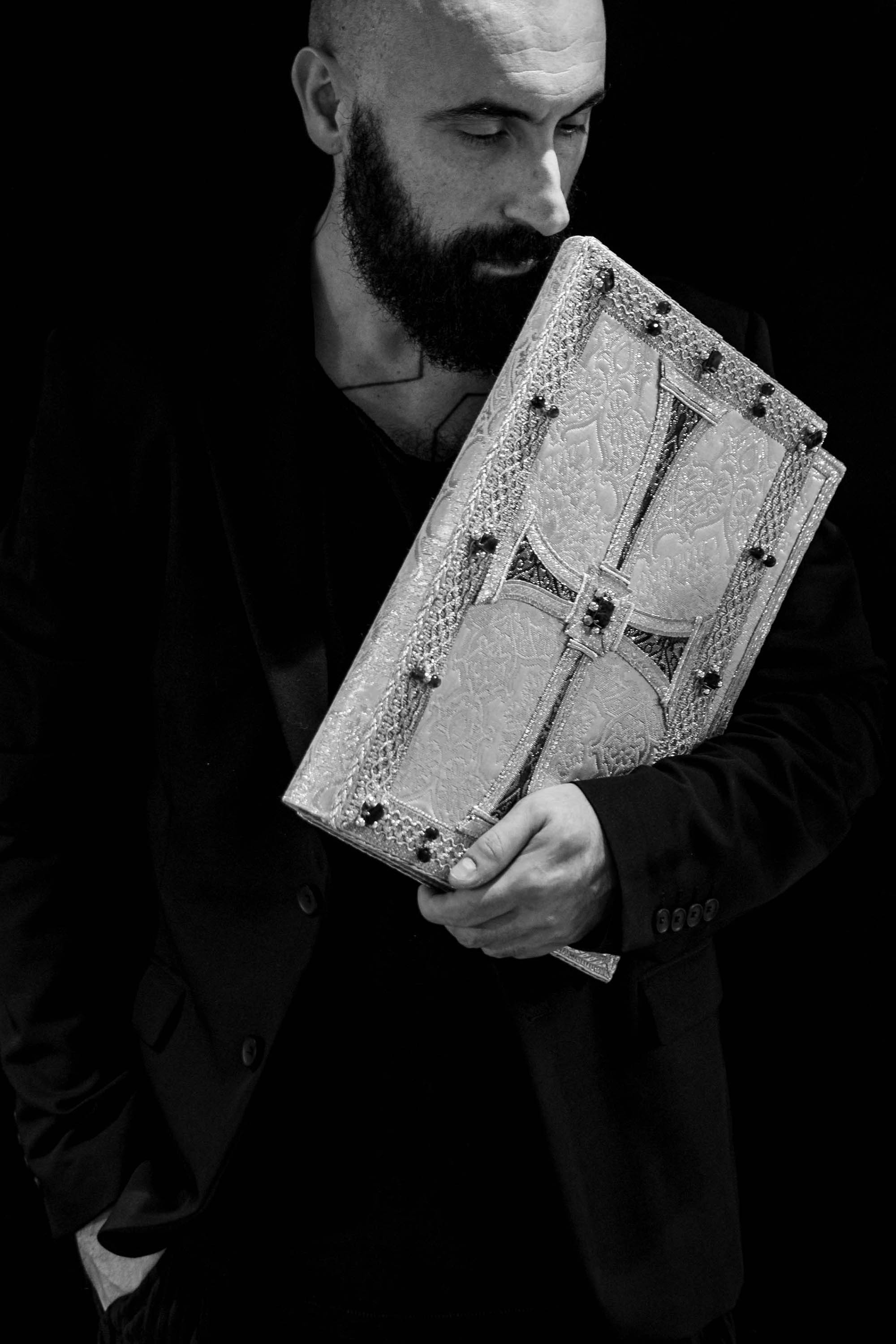
- Born: July 1, 1975 (age 51); Mondolfo, Pesaro and Urbino, Italy
- Occupations: designer, artist, organist
- Website: atelierlavs.com

Filippo Sorcinelli (born 1 July 1975) is an Italian designer, artist, perfumer, and organist. He is the owner of the fashion company Atelier Lavs and has tailored vestments for Pope Benedict XVI, Pope Francis and Pope Leo XIV.

== Early life and education ==
He grew up in Mondolfo, a commune in the Marche region of Italy. His family members worked as weavers and seamstresses. When he was thirteen years old, he became an organist and performed at cathedrals in Fano, Rimini, and San Benedetto del Tronto.

Sorcinelli studied sacred art and historical weaving at the Museo del Tessuto in Prato.

== Career ==
Sorcinelli works as a painter, designer, photographer, and perfumer. He is the owner of Atelier Lavs, a fashion house in Santarcangelo di Romagna.

He was initially inspired to begin creating liturgical vestments on a full-time basis when in his early twenties, he created vestments for a friend who was soon to be ordained a priest. This led rise to the creation of LAVS (Laboratorio Arte Vesti Sacre), his atelier.

In 2007, he began dressing Pope Benedict XVI, designing over fifty pieces for him. He made his first garment for Pope Francis in 2013, following a call from the Office for the Liturgical Celebrations of the Supreme Pontiff. His first design, a simple cream, white, and gold piece, was worn by the pope for his first papal mass. He designed the mitres that the pope wore during his lying in state.

He has also designed vestments for other Catholic clergy, including Cardinal Tarcisio Bertone, the Archbishop of Genoa.

In 2018, the Diocesan Museum of Milan held a exhibit of his work. In 2021, he received the Art and Liturgy Prize for innovation in the field of sacred vestments from the Pontifical Liturgical Institute.

In 2013, Sorcinelli released his conceptual perfume house UNUM, with its first fragrance LAVS. He was inspired to create the perfume line by the scents that he would spray on the papal garments. In 2026, he released new fragrances, including Vulnus, Quickie and Coffee, and Cruising Area.

== Personal life ==
Sorcinelli is a practicing Catholic and openly gay.
