= Trecastelli =

- Comune
- Comune di Trecastelli
- Location within Italy Location within Marche
- Coordinates: 43°40′18.82″N 13°6′22.72″E
- Country: Italy
- Region: Marche
- Province: Province of Ancona (AN)
- Frazioni: Brugnetto, Castel Colonna, Croce, Francavilla, Giombino, Monterado, Passo Ripe, Ponte Lucerta, Ponterio, Ripe

Government
  - Mayor: Faustino Conigli

Area
  - Total: 38.66 km^{2} (14.93 sq mi)
- Elevation: 143 m (469 ft)

Population (30 November 2017)
  - Total: 7,570
  - Density: 196/km^{2} (507/sq mi)
- Time zone: UTC+1 (CET)
  - Summer (DST): UTC+2 (CEST)
- Postal code: 60012
- Dialing code: 071
- Patron saint: John Paul II
- Saint day: 22 October
- Website: Official website

Trecastelli is an Italian comune in the province of Ancona, in Marche, created in 2014 from the merger of the comuni of Ripe, Castel Colonna and Monterado. These three towns are now frazioni of the administration. The municipal seat is in Ripe.

The municipality borders with Corinaldo, Mondolfo, Monte Porzio, Ostra, San Costanzo and Senigallia.
