= Monterado =

- Comune
- former Comune di Monterado
- Location within Italy Location within Marche
- Coordinates: 43°42′N 13°5′E
- Country: Italy
- Region: Marche
- Province: Province of Ancona (AN)
- Frazioni: Ponterio

Area
  - Total: 10.3 km^{2} (4.0 sq mi)

Population (Dec. 2004)
  - Total: 1,803
  - Density: 175/km^{2} (453/sq mi)
- Demonym: Monteradesi
- Time zone: UTC+1 (CET)
  - Summer (DST): UTC+2 (CEST)
- Postal code: 60010
- Dialing code: 071
- disbanded 1 january 2014

Monterado was a comune (municipality) in the Province of Ancona in the Italian region Marche, located about 35 kilometres (22 mi) west of Ancona.

The municipality of Monterado was disbanded 1 January 2014 and united to Castel Colonna and Ripe in the new municipality of Trecastelli.

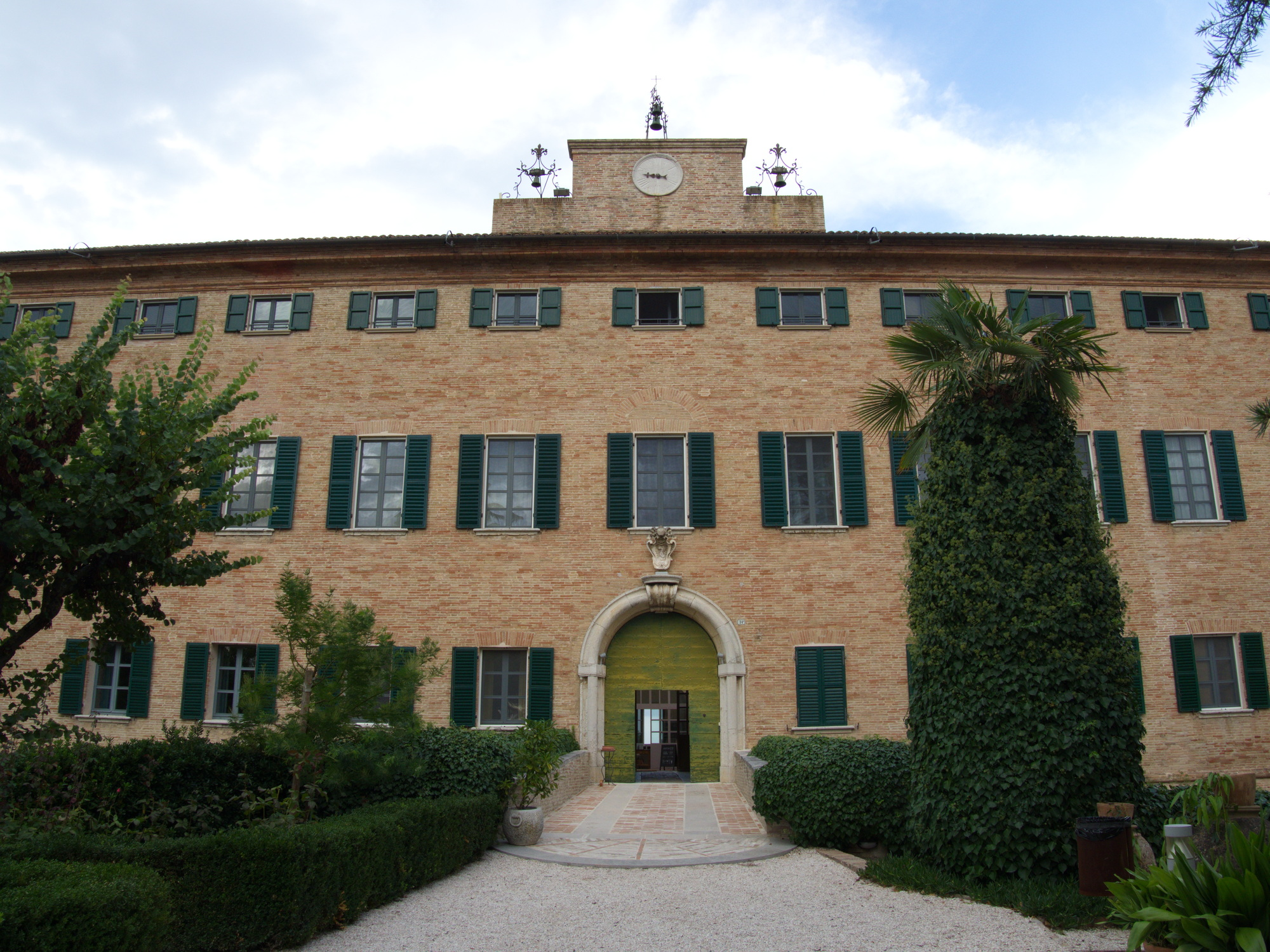

== Demographic evolution ==
Historical population

Year	Pop.	±%
1861	1,074	—
1871	1,080	+0.6%
1881	1,104	+2.2%
1901	1,347	+22.0%
1911	1,440	+6.9%

Year	Pop.	±%
1921	1,486	+3.2%
1931	1,593	+7.2%
1936	1,598	+0.3%
1951	1,650	+3.3%
1961	1,566	−5.1%

Year	Pop.	±%
1971	1,286	−17.9%
1981	1,414	+10.0%
1991	1,471	+4.0%
2001	1,569	+6.7%

Source: Data from ISTAT
