= Franco Trappoli =

Italian politician

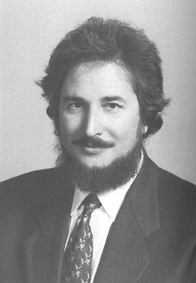

Mayor of Fano
- In office 1980–1983
- Preceded by: Enzo Cicetti
- Succeeded by: Gustavo Mazzoni

Member of the Chamber of Deputies
- In office 12 July 1983 – 1 July 1987
- Constituency: Ancona
- In office 23 April 1992 – 14 April 1994
- Constituency: Ancona

Personal details
- Born: 5 November 1947 (age 78) Orvieto, Italy
- Party: Italian Socialist Party
- Profession: Politician

Franco Trappoli (born 5 November 1947) is an Italian politician, formerly of the Italian Socialist Party. He served as the mayor of Fano from 1980 to 1983 and was a member of the Italian Chamber of Deputies.

== Biography ==
Born in Orvieto in 1947, he graduated in the field of economic and commercial sciences.

He was the mayor of Fano from 1980 to 1983 and served as a member of the Italian Chamber of Deputies from 1983 to 1987 and from 1992 to 1994.

He was the first Buddhist to become a member of the Italian Chamber of Deputies.
