= Francesco Magini =

Italian composer

Francesco Magini (Fano, between 1668 and 1670–1714) was a minor Italian composer active in Rome in the first decade of the eighteenth century.

== Recordings ==
- Aria Da che vide il tuo sembiante, Maite Beaumont
