= Ripe, Marche =

Ripe
- Comune
- former Comune di Ripe
- Location within Italy Location within Marche
- Coordinates: 43°40′N 13°6′E
- Country: Italy
- Region: Marche
- Province: Province of Ancona (AN)

Area
  - Total: 15.0 km^{2} (5.8 sq mi)
- Elevation: 150 m (490 ft)

Population (Dec. 2004)
  - Total: 3,869
  - Density: 258/km^{2} (668/sq mi)
- Time zone: UTC+1 (CET)
  - Summer (DST): UTC+2 (CEST)
- Postal code: 60010
- Dialing code: 071
- disbanded 1 january 2014

Ripe was a comune (municipality) in the Province of Ancona in the Italian region Marche, located about 35 kilometres (22 mi) west of Ancona.

The municipality of Ripe was disbanded 1 January 2014 and united to Castel Colonna and Monterado in the new municipality of Trecastelli.

Town hall of the new administration was set in former Ripe's offices in Piazza Castello, 1

== Demographic evolution ==
Historical population

Year	Pop.	±%
1861	2,001	—
1871	2,192	+9.5%
1881	2,187	−0.2%
1901	2,478	+13.3%
1911	2,553	+3.0%

Year	Pop.	±%
1921	2,685	+5.2%
1931	2,755	+2.6%
1936	2,878	+4.5%
1951	2,954	+2.6%
1961	2,696	−8.7%

Year	Pop.	±%
1971	2,531	−6.1%
1981	2,781	+9.9%
1991	3,066	+10.2%
2001	3,575	+16.6%

Source: Data from ISTAT
