= Sanctuary of the Madonna delle Grotte, Mondolfo =

Catholic church in Pesaro and Urbino province, Italy

Coordinates: 43°44′56.2″N 13°05′25.7″E

The Sanctuary of the Madonna delle Grotte in the town of Mondolfo, province of Pesaro and Urbino, region of Marche is a 17th-century Roman Catholic church, specifically a Marian shrine.

== History ==
The shrine was erected in 1682 by the Confraternity 'della Misericordia (of the Mercy). The church was erected after a terracotta statue of the Madonna and child were discovered inside a natural sinkhole in the local sandstone by a member of the Confraternity. Soon miracles were attributed to the statue and this brick and stone church was built to house the venerated image. Many of the architectural elements drive from a prior nearby castle, likely belonging to Giovanni della Rovere. The interior has baroque decoration. A cemetery was established adjacent in 1781.
