= San Sebastiano, Mondolfo =

Church in Mondolfo, Italy

San Sebastiano is a Roman Catholic church located in the town of Mondolfo, province of Pesaro and Urbino, region of Marche, Italy.

== History ==
The church, built in a Greek cross layout, was built in 1479 as an ex voto by the community for the ebbing of the plague. During the 16th century, it was affiliated with the Franciscan order, until their expulsion during the Napoleonic occupation. The church was refurbished in the 18th century. The adjacent convent is highly altered. Sebastiano Ceccarini painted an altarpiece, depicting the Madonna and Child with St Francis and St Sebastian and the Castle of Mondolfo in Background.
