= Paternion =

- Municipality
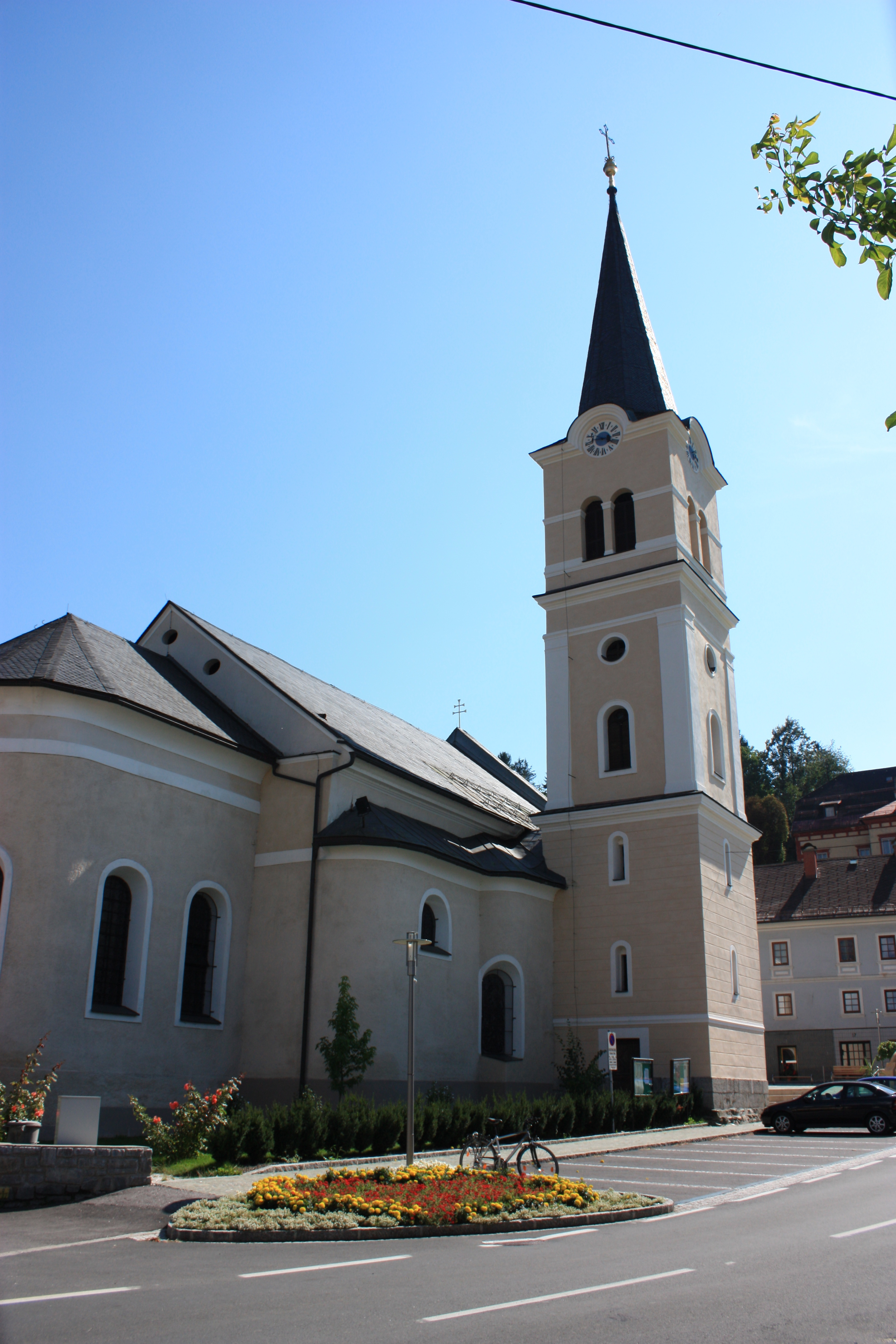
- Saint Paternian's Church

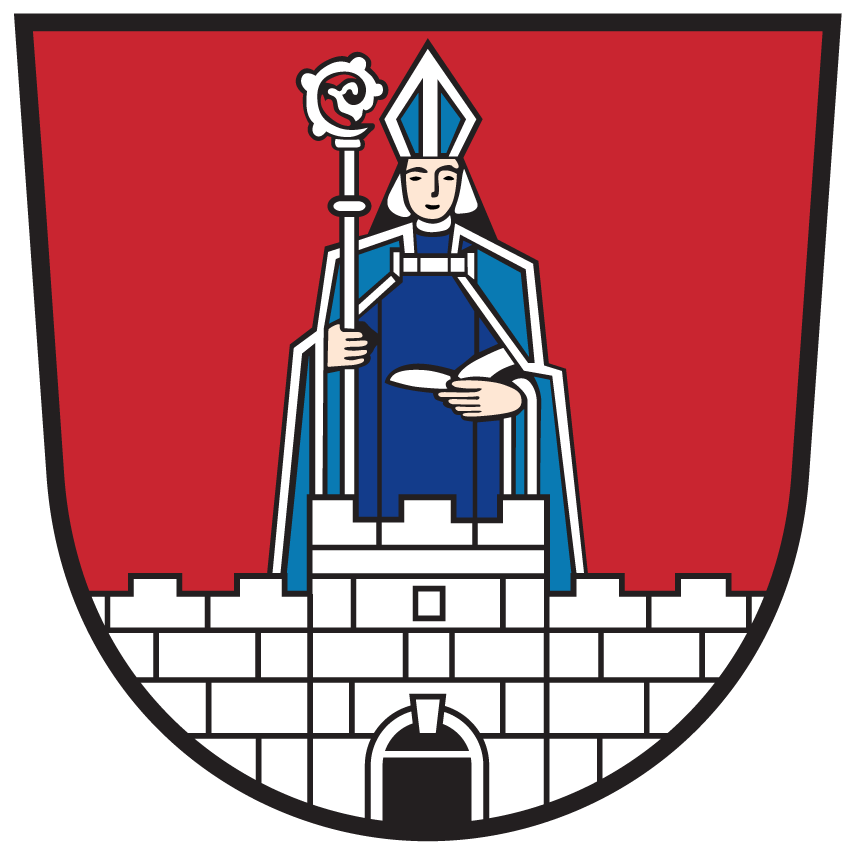
- Coat of arms

- Location within Austria Paternion (Austria)
- Coordinates: 46°43′N 13°38′E
- Country: Austria
- State: Carinthia
- District: Villach-Land

Government
  - Mayor: Manuel Müller (SPÖ)

Area
  - Total: 105.49 km^{2} (40.73 sq mi)
- Elevation: 519 m (1,703 ft)

Population (2018-01-01)
  - Total: 5,819
  - Density: 55.16/km^{2} (142.9/sq mi)
- Time zone: UTC+1 (CET)
  - Summer (DST): UTC+2 (CEST)
- Postal code: 9711
- Area code: 04245
- Website: www.paternion.at

Paternion (Slovene: Špatrjan) is a market town in the district of Villach-Land in the Austrian state of Carinthia. It is located within the Drava valley about 18 kilometres (11 mi) in the north-west of the city of Villach.

== Geography ==
Paternion is subdivided into six Katastralgemeinden: Feistritz an der Drau, Kamering, Kreuzen, Nikelsdorf, Paternion and Rubland.

== History ==
Settled since the Hallstatt culture, the place was first mentioned as St. Paternianus in a 1296 deed, named after Saint Paternian, the Bishop of Fano, as the area south of the Drava then belonged to the Patriarchate of Aquileia. In 1530 Paternion received market rights from Archduke Ferdinand I of Austria. With a percentage of about 30%, the municipality is today one of the centres of Protestantism in Carinthia.

Paternion Castle was part of the Lordship of Paternion (Herrschaft Paternion), together with the castles at Pöllan and Kreuzen and 8,800 hectares of forests. In the late 19th century they passed from the counts Widmann-Rezzonico to count Piero Foscari from Venice, and they are still today owned by the Foscari-Widmann-Rezzonico family.

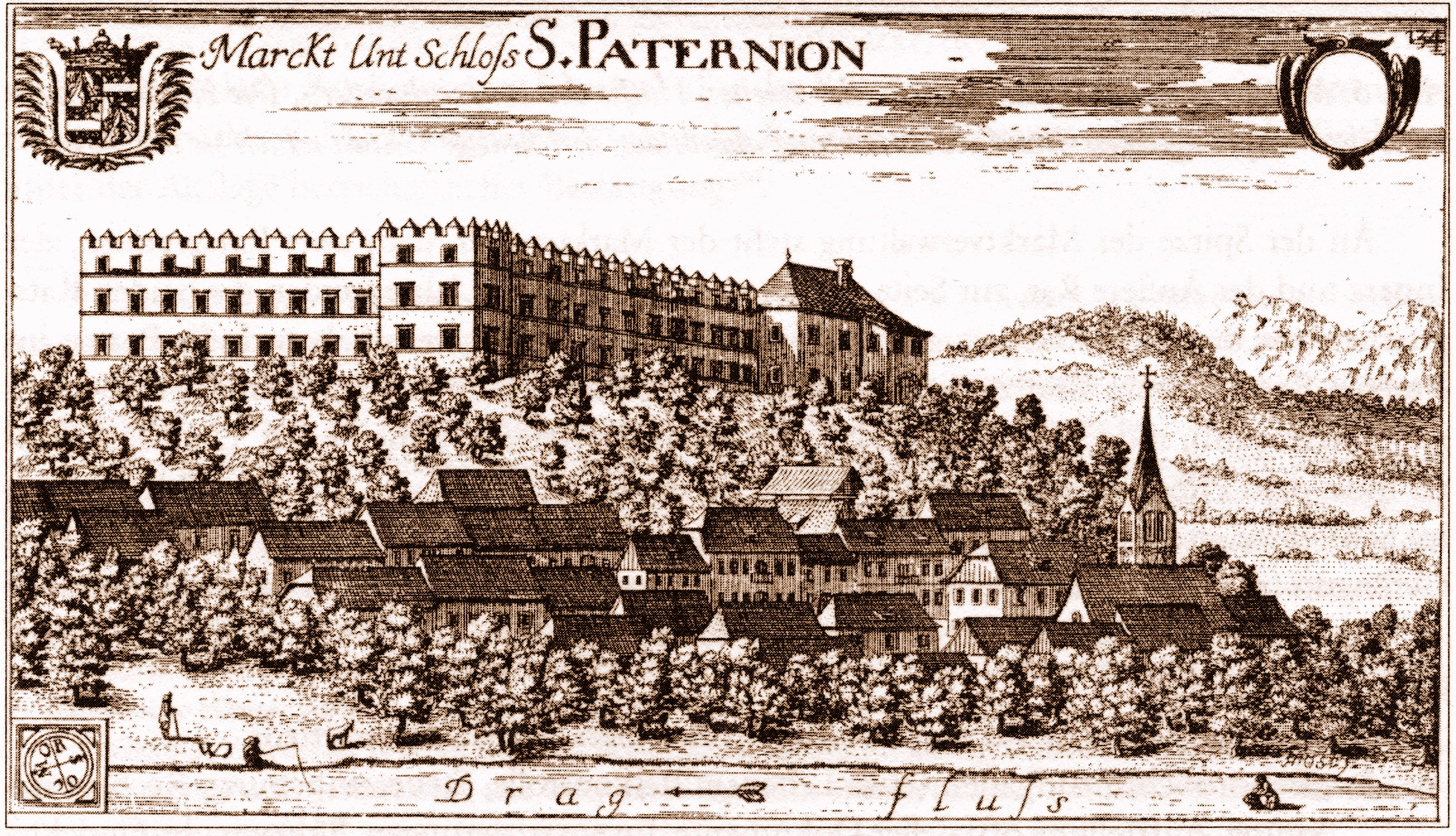
Paternion Castle (1688)

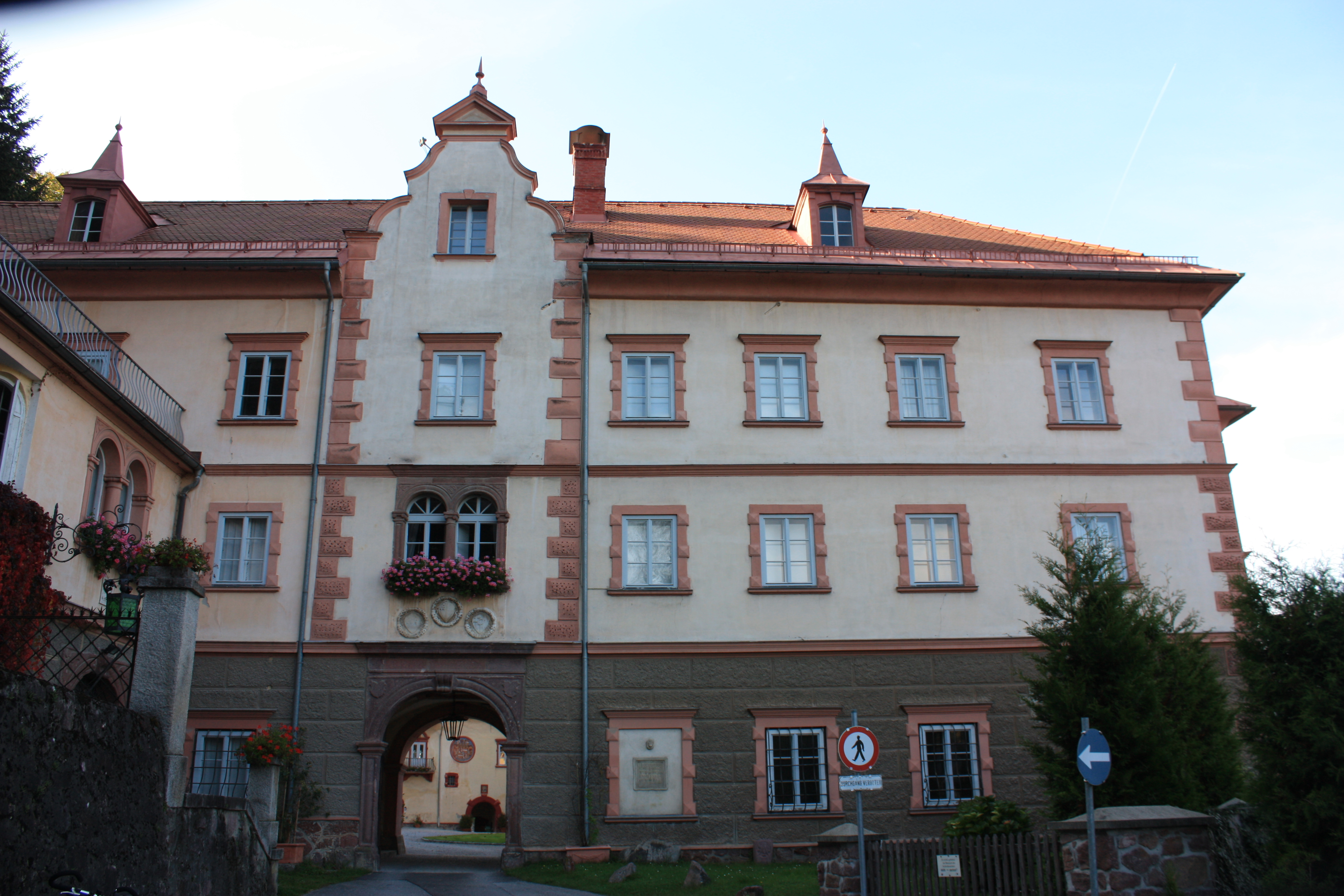
Paternion Castle

== Politics ==
Seats in the municipal assembly (Gemeinderat) as of 2021 elections:

- Social Democratic Party of Austria (SPÖ): 18
- Freedom Party of Austria (FPÖ): 2
- Austrian People's Party (ÖVP): 2
- The Greens - The Green Alternative: 1

== Notable people ==
- Mr. Bond, far-right rapper

== Twin town ==
- Ladenburg, Germany
