= San Gervasio, Mondolfo =

Church in Mondolfo, Italy

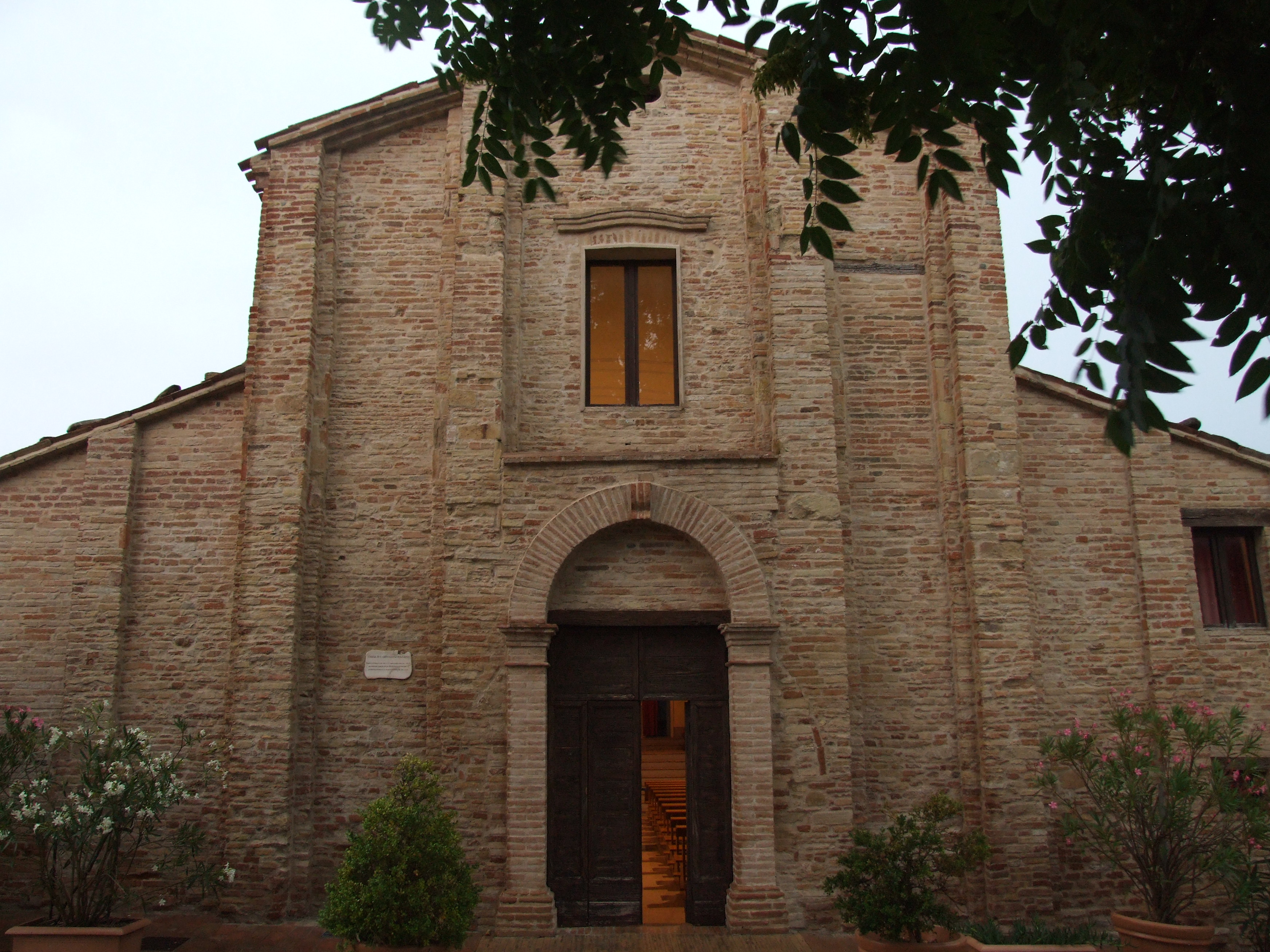
San Gervasio façade.

San Gervasio dei Bulgari is a Romanesque-style, Roman Catholic church located in Mondolfo, province of Pesaro and Urbino, region of Marche, Italy.

== History ==
The church is ancient, founded perhaps in the 5th or 6th century, in a territory inhabited in those times by Bulgar immigrants. The church has a basilica layout with three naves. It may have formerly been a barracks in ancient Roman times for the Ad Pirum Filumeni. The crypt has a 6th-century sarcophagus that supposedly held the body of St Gervasius, patron of the town.
