= Francesco Mancini (1679–1758) =

Italian painter (1679–1758)

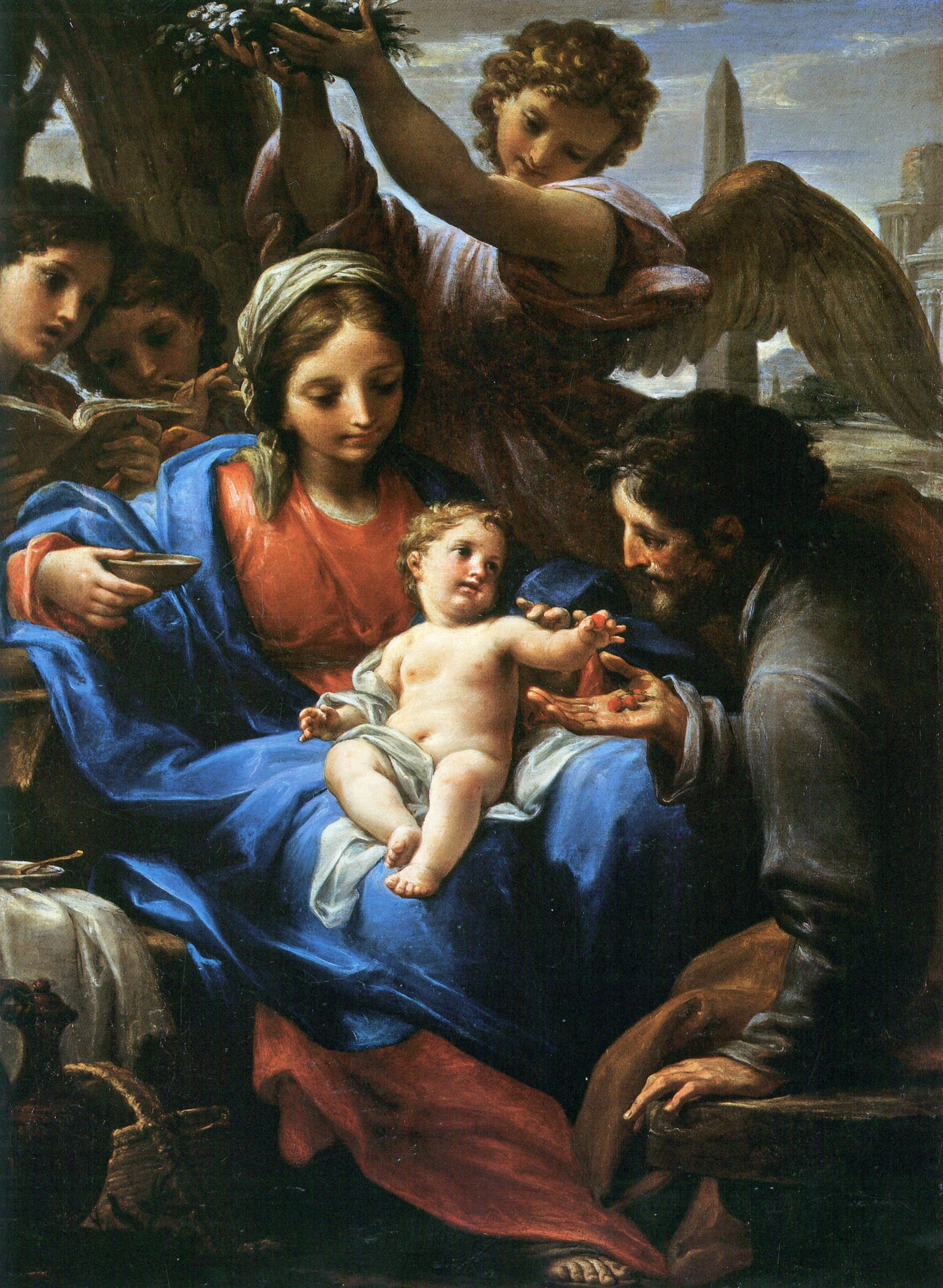
F. Mancini, Riposo durante la fuga in Egitto, Musei Vaticani

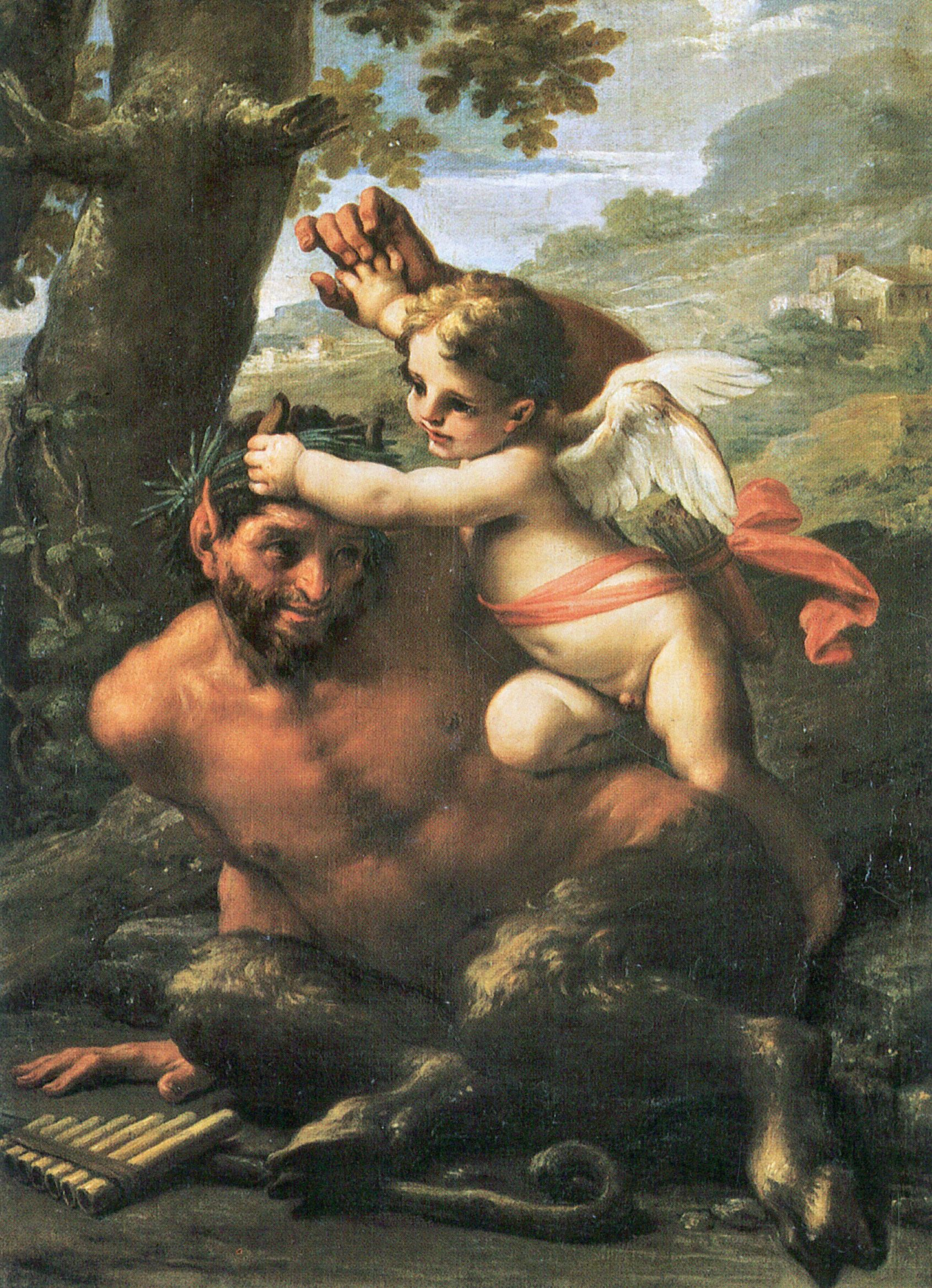
F. Mancini, Lotta fra Amore e Pan, Musei Vaticani

Francesco Mancini (24 April 1679–August 1758) was an Italian painter whose works are known between 1719 and 1756. He was the pupil of Carlo Cignani.

== Biography ==
A native of Sant'Angelo in Vado, he was a student of Carlo Cignani at Forlì and at Bologna and was introduced to academic painting in the manner of the Carracci; echoes of this style of painting can be seen in his juvenile works: the frescoes of the Libreria in the main hall of the Biblioteca Classense in Ravenna, and those in Foligno Cathedral depicting the Life of Angela di Foligno.

On the advice of the artist Marcantonio Franceschini, vice-prince of the Accademia Clementina in Bologna, he moved to Rome, where he made contact with Carlo Maratta, also a native of the Marche. This contact with Maratta's mature work, and with his pupils, is reflected by further developments in Mancini's painting. From this period are the frescoes in the Palazzo del Quirinale, those in the Chiesa Nuova dei Filippini in Perugia (1730), in the Marian Shrine of the Basilica of Santa Maria della Misericordia, Macerata (1736), and others at Sant'Angelo in Vado, Forlì and Rimini. Francesco Mancini was held by his contemporaries as one of the best painters of the time: above all, the clear and luminous tones of his work were admired. He was a member of the French Academy in Rome (1732), the Accademia dei Virtuosi in the Pantheon of Rome (1743 and 1745) and director of the Accademia di San Luca (1750–51).

His pupils included Sebastiano Ceccarini, Domenico Corvi, Niccolò Lapiccola of Crotone and Canon Giovanni Andrea Lazzarini.

== Selected works ==
- Nascita della vergine, Napoli, Collezione Molaro
- Addolorata, Pinacoteca di Fano
- Dominique quo vadis?, Pinacoteca Comunale di Città di Castello
- Apparizione di Gesù Cristo a San Pietro, Roma, Palazzo Quirinale
- Cristo in Gloria con i Santi Clemente e Ignazio d'Antiochia, Urbino, Galleria Nazionale delle Marche
- Estasi di Santa Teresa, Roma, Chiesa di Santa Maria della Scala
- La Castità che fustiga Amore, Roma, Palazzo del Quirinale
- La Concezione, Roma, Chiesa di San Gregorio al Celio
- Lotta fra Amore e Pan, Roma, Pinacoteca Vaticana, Sala XV, inventario 40748
- Riposo durante la fuga in Egitto, Roma, Pinacoteca Vaticana, Sala XV, inventario 40398
- Sacra Famiglia, Roma, Palazzo Quirinale
- San Damiano, Roma, Chiesa di San Gregorio al Celio
- San Francesco in preghiera, Pinacoteca di Fano
- San Francesco di Paola, Sant'Angelo in Vado, Church of Santa Maria dei Servi
- San Giovanni Battista, Pinacoteca di Fano
- San Nicola da Tolentino, Sant'Angelo in Vado, Church of Santa Maria dei Servi
- San Pietro e San Giovanni che guariscono uno storpio, Roma, Palazzo del Quirinale
- Sant'Agnese, Pinacoteca di Ancona
- Storie di Amore e Psiche, Roma, Palazzo Colonna
- Transito di San Giuseppe, Pinacoteca di Fano
- Via Crucis, Pioraco, Chiesa di San Francesco
- Vergine Addolorata, Urbino, Galleria Nazionale delle Marche
- Assunzione della Vergine, Convento Reale di Mafra - Portogallo

== Bibliography ==
- Accademia nazionale di San Luca, Memorie per servire alla storia della Romana Accademia di S. Luca fino alla morte di Antonio Canova, compilate da Melchior Missirini. Roma: Stamperia De Romanis, 1823, p. 227-8 (on-line)
- Amico Ricci, Memorie storiche delle arti e degli artisti della Marca di Ancona, del marchese Amico Ricci. Macerata: Tipografia di Alessandro Mancini, 1834, vol. I, pp. 415–117 (on-line)
- "MANCINI (Francesco)" in Carlo Antonio Vanzon (ed.), Dizionario universale della lingua italiana ed insieme di geografia, ecc, preceduto da una esposizione grammaticale ragionata della lingua italiana, Livorno: dalla Stamperia di Paolo Vannini, 1836, Tomo IV (M-N-O), p. 91 (on-line)
- Hermann Voss, Die Malerei des Barock in Rom. Berlin: im Propylaen Verlag, 1924.
