= Castel Colonna =

- Comune
- former Comune di Castel Colonna
- Coat of arms

- Location within Italy Location within Marche
- Coordinates: 43°40′43″N 13°6′25″E
- Country: Italy
- Region: Marche
- Province: Ancona (AN)
- Frazioni: Croce, Francavilla, Giombino

Government
  - Mayor: Massimo Lorenzetti

Area
  - Total: 13.3 km^{2} (5.1 sq mi)
- Elevation: 125 m (410 ft)

Population (28 February 2009)
  - Total: 1,069
  - Density: 80.4/km^{2} (208/sq mi)
- Demonym: Castelcolonnesi
- Time zone: UTC+1 (CET)
  - Summer (DST): UTC+2 (CEST)
- Postal code: 60010
- Dialing code: 071
- Patron saint: Santa Marina
- Saint day: 17 July

Castel Colonna was a comune (municipality) in the Province of Ancona in the Italian region Marche, located about 35 kilometres (22 mi) west of Ancona. It was called Tomba di Senigallia until 1921.

The municipality of Castel Colonna was disbanded 1 January 2014 and united to Ripe and Monterado in the new municipality of Trecastelli.

Town hall of the new administration was set in former Ripe's offices in Piazza Castello.
