= Mr. Bond (musician) =

Austrian neo-Nazi rapper (born 1986)

- Born: Philip Josef Hassler; 1986 (age 39–40); Paternion, Carinthia, Austria
- Occupations: Singer, rapper
- Status: Incarcerated
- Conviction: Glorifying Nazism
- Penalty: 10 years imprisonment

Philip Josef Hassler (born c. 1986), known under the alias of Mr. Bond, is a pseudonymous Austrian neo-Nazi rapper and musical artist who published numerous songs with racist themes. Hassler's songs were largely in English, parodies or covers of other songs. His music had violent themes and celebrated violence against non-white and gay people. He dedicated an album to Robert Bowers, who committed a mass shooting at a synagogue in Pittsburgh in 2018.

Following the 2019 Halle synagogue shooting, where the perpetrator livestreamed one of Hassler's songs while committing the attack, attention was drawn to Hassler. He was arrested in January 2021 and sentenced to 10 years in prison in April 2022 for glorifying Nazism.

== Background ==
Philip Josef Hassler born c. 1986, was a former insurance clerk, and was unemployed except for his music at the time of his arrest. He lived in his hometown of Paternion, Carinthia. He was said to have lived an introverted and withdrawn life as a loner. He met with other neo-Nazis in Vienna and had ties to the Identitarian movement.

Hassler bragged about working with Californian senate candidate Patrick Little, who he said he was greatly inspired by and had worked with, designing posters for his campaign, where Little had denied the Holocaust. Hassler had posted on neo-Nazi forums since 2016, including on the forum of the Nordic Resistance Movement and 8chan. After the murder of Walter Lübcke, who was murdered by a neo-Nazi in 2019, Hassler celebrated the murder and called the murderer a "German hero".

== Music ==
Hassler began to post music in 2016, mainly in English. His songs are largely parodies or covers of rap and pop songs. For example, he turned "Wind of Change" by Scorpions to "Winds of Adolf", Bloodhound Gang to "The Mosque Is On Fire", and "I Wanna Love You" by Akon and Snoop Dogg to "I Wanna Gas You". A researcher at a German anti-racist group described him as "far-right Weird Al". He released five albums in total, among them two named after Adolf Hitler's Mein Kampf, in addition to A Nazi Goes to Afrika and a six hour album of Greatest Hits. The cover of the first Mein Kampf album features Hitler wearing sunglasses and a gold chain, while the second features Hitler in a Supreme hat. He collaborated with the neo-Nazi musician Morrakiu and Moon Man (Moon Man is not actually a person, but a type of song parody with a computer generated voice popular with online racist groups, which is presented using the character of McDonald's mascot Mac Tonight).

His music had violent themes, and celebrated the Holocaust and acts of far-right terrorism, calling for the murder of several groups (among them gay people, black people, and Jews). Researchers noted him as especially obsessed with Brenton Tarrant, the perpetrator of the 2019 Christchurch mosque shootings, praising him as a "saint" in his music and forum posts. Hassler also translated Tarrant's manifesto into German and distributed it. Hassler's final album, Screw Your Optics, I'm Going In, was dedicated to Robert Bowers, who committed a mass shooting at a synagogue in Pittsburgh in 2018; it was titled after a quote from Bowers prior to attacking the synagogue. Researcher Thomas Pfeiffer said many of Hassler's lyrics "far exceed the threshold of criminal liability". Music videos for his songs often featured the neo-Nazi Black Sun symbol. In one of his songs, "Dear Donald", he criticized US president Donald Trump as a traitor to white America.

Hassler's music was popular with the online far-right. At one time, his music was available on Spotify, YouTube, and Apple Music. His songs were featured on the podcast of the Nordic Resistance Movement. Even several years after his arrest in 2024, his music could be found on Spotify, for nearly a year. This resulted in criticism of Spotify from Expo for failing to remove it until they notified them. His music allowed him to make a living and he was found to have tens of thousands of euros in cryptocurrency in his accounts.

== Investigation and arrest ==
On 9 October 2019, Hassler's song Power Level (a cover of "Mask Off" by Future) was played on livestream by Stephan Balliet, who committed the Halle synagogue shooting. This lyrics incorporates esoteric neo-Nazi elements, especially the Black Sun and the "Vril force", with Hassler linking the Black Sun to Hyperborea, Thule and Atlantis. Balliet playing this song during the livestream drew attention to Hassler. Balliet later stated he chose Hassler's song to provide "commentary on the act". Hassler initially praised Balliet but later expressed his disappointment in the attack as a failure because he did not kill any Jews and failed to enter the synagogue.

Mr. Bond was arrested at his home in Paternion, Carinthia, Austria in Fand on 20 January 2021, for distributing Nazi propaganda and sedition. During police interviews he remained silent. He was also suspected of copyright infringement. He had stated in one of his songs that he was from Austria. Mr. Bond was identified by Austrian investigators through PayPal. Nazi materials were found in his home, and several items were seized after police search, among them weapons and the lyrics to his songs. He was charged with "acting in the spirit of Nazism", which carried a maximum sentence of 20 years. In November, his lawyer filed an objection, claiming he had not authored the texts of which he was accused. Charges were filed against him in December. American neo-Nazis tried to raise money for him.

On 19 August 2021, a student at Källeberg school in Eslöv, Sweden, injured a teacher with a knife, whilst livestreaming the act to Twitch, the police report alleges, as there is no publicly available version of the stream, that the song "Power Level" - the same one played during the Halle shooting - had played at one point during the livestream. The choice of song was likely a reference to Balliet.

In April 2022, he was found guilty and sentenced to 10 years in prison. As a result of the investigation into Philip, Hassler's younger brother Benjamin Hassler was unmasked as the manager of the neo-Nazi website "judas.watch", also uploading his brother's songs, and he was sentenced to four years in prison. In September 2020 a connection was also found between Hassler, his brother, and Balliet on a web forum. Following Hassler's imprisonment, neo-Nazis expressed their support of him and advocated he be freed. In 2023, several of his fans published an "Enemy List" online, naming 15 individuals who they blamed for Hassler's conviction. His supporters built a website where they could write to him, and the Nordic Resistance Movement created several podcasts supporting him.

== Discography ==
=== Mixtapes ===
Year	Details
2016	Mein Kampf Mixtape Vol. 1488: Released: 2016; Tracks: 20
2016	Mein Kampf Mixtape Vol. 1488 Chapter II: Released: 2016; Tracks: 15
2017	Woke Alone: Released: 2017; Tracks: 18
2018	A Nazi Goes To Afrika: Released: 2018; Tracks: 20
2019	Screw Your Optics, I'm Going In: Released: 2019; Tracks: 17
