= Carlo Magini =

Italian painter (1720–1806)

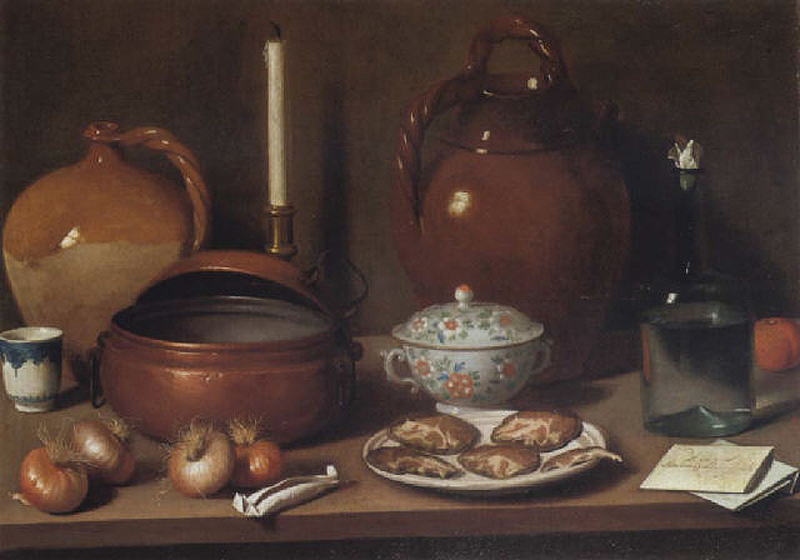
Still life

Carlo Magini (1720–1806) was an Italian painter of the late-Baroque period and one of the most original of the 18th century Italian still life artists.

== Life ==
He was born on 16 September 1720 in Fano, region of the Marche. Carlo was the son of Francis Magini, a goldsmith. His mother, Elizabeth Ceccarini, was the sister of the painter Sebastiano Ceccarini. Little is known about the details of Carlo's life. It is possible he trained with his uncle Sebastiano. In 1736, the Oratorians in Perugia commissioned Sebastiano Ceccarini to paint frescos in the Chapel of the Crucifix in their church of San Filippo. Sebastiano Ceccarini asked to be allowed to bring his nephew to help. The nephew was likely Carlo Magini, who would follow his uncle during his journeys through cities like Urbino, Perugia, Bologna, Florence and Venice between 1735 and 1738. Carlo Magini was present in Rome in 1742 and in 1743.

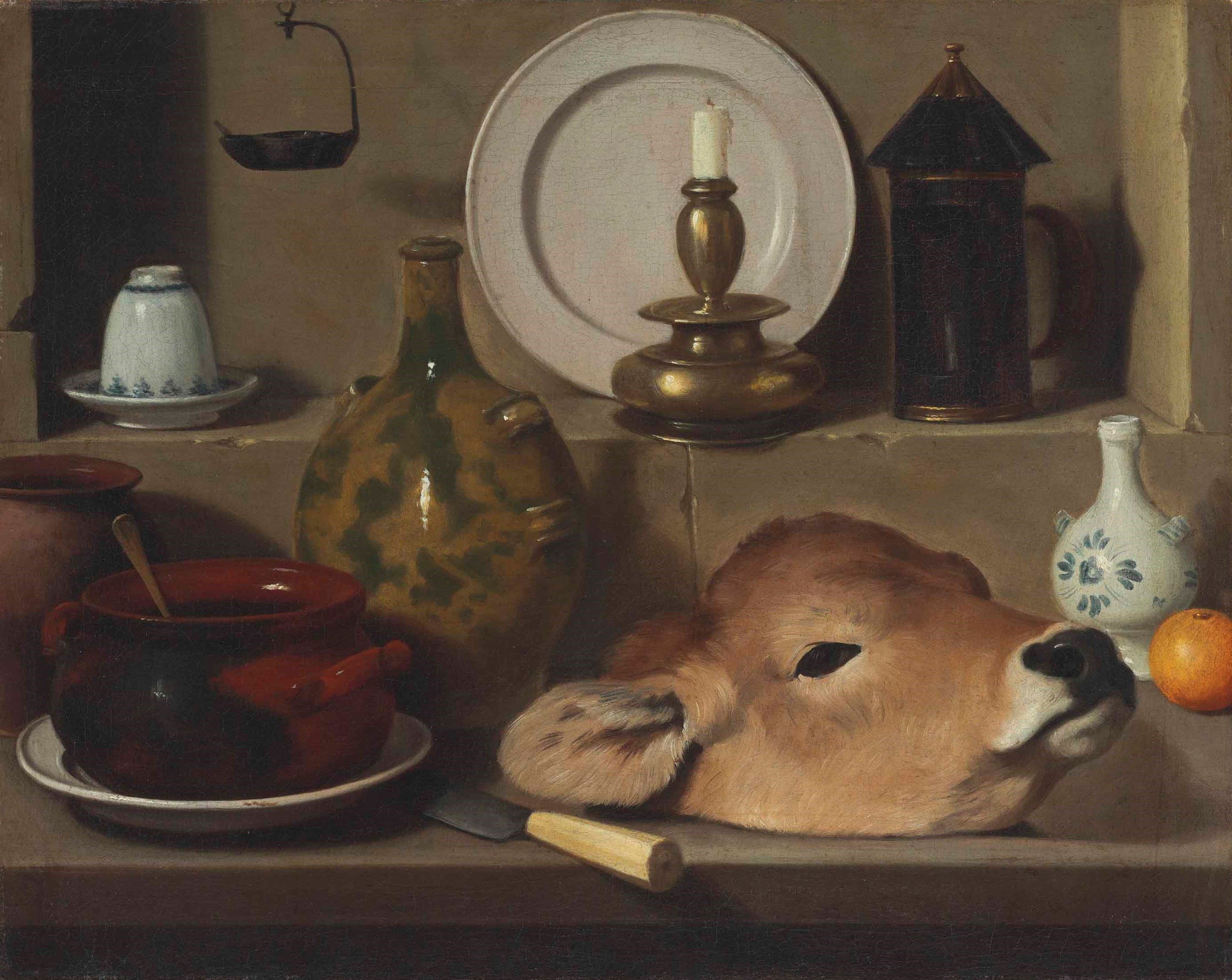
An oil lamp, ceramics, brass lantern, knife, onion and calf's head

By 1748, the artist had returned to Fan0, where he married Michelina Polinori of Pesaro on 14 July of that year. Their eldest daughter, Francesca, was born on 30 March 1750. He remained active in his hometown, where he died in 1806.

== Work ==
Magini mainly painted still life subjects, mainly specialising in breakfast or bodegón style pieces, depicting mainly table settings with different, apparently unrelated, elements in juxtaposition. He was also recorded, but far less recognised, as a portrait painter. His known works, amounting to about 100 canvases, have been attributed on the basis of a number of signed pieces. A number of works are displayed at the Quadreria della Fondazione Cassa di Risparmio di Fano in Fano. It is difficult to establish a timeline for his still lifes as the works were never dated and rarely, if at all, documented.

His compositions appear simple, but are typically very artfully composed. Magini was interested in exploring the relationships between form, colour, light, shadow and textures. His canvases are all composed along the same severe lines, avoiding any baroque frivolity and yet achieve a highly original and effective naturalist aesthetic. The work of Magini stands in the tradition of Caravaggio, Velázquez and his near-contemporaries the Spaniard Luis Egidio Meléndez and the Frenchman Chardin.
