= Santa Giustina, Mondolfo =

Collegiate and parish Roman Catholic church

Coordinates: 43°45′05″N 13°05′46″E

Santa Giustina is a collegiate and parish Roman Catholic church in Mondolfo, Italy.

== History ==
The first documentation of a church of Santa Giustina dates to the 13th century when a church was erected around the cult of an ancient crucifix with the inscription D. Thomas Blebanus istius Plebis A.D. 1227. This became the main church of Mondolfo. Having been completely rebuilt after the earthquake of 1600, Pope Urban VIII Barberini raised it to the title of Collegiata Insigne in 1635. The church was refurbished to its present layout during the 18th century, reconsecrated in 1760. During the next century the Cappellone (large chapel) del Santissimi Sacramento was added to house the Statue of the Madonna della Misericordia with a silver key to the town.

The interior has a baroque decoration with various canvases. The main altarpiece in a golden frame depicts the Madonna and Child with Saints Giustina and Lorenzo; the side medallions depict St Jerome and Mary Magdalen. The 18th-century organ was made by Gaetano Callido and is used for concerts.
