= Paternian =

Italian saint

Saint Paternian
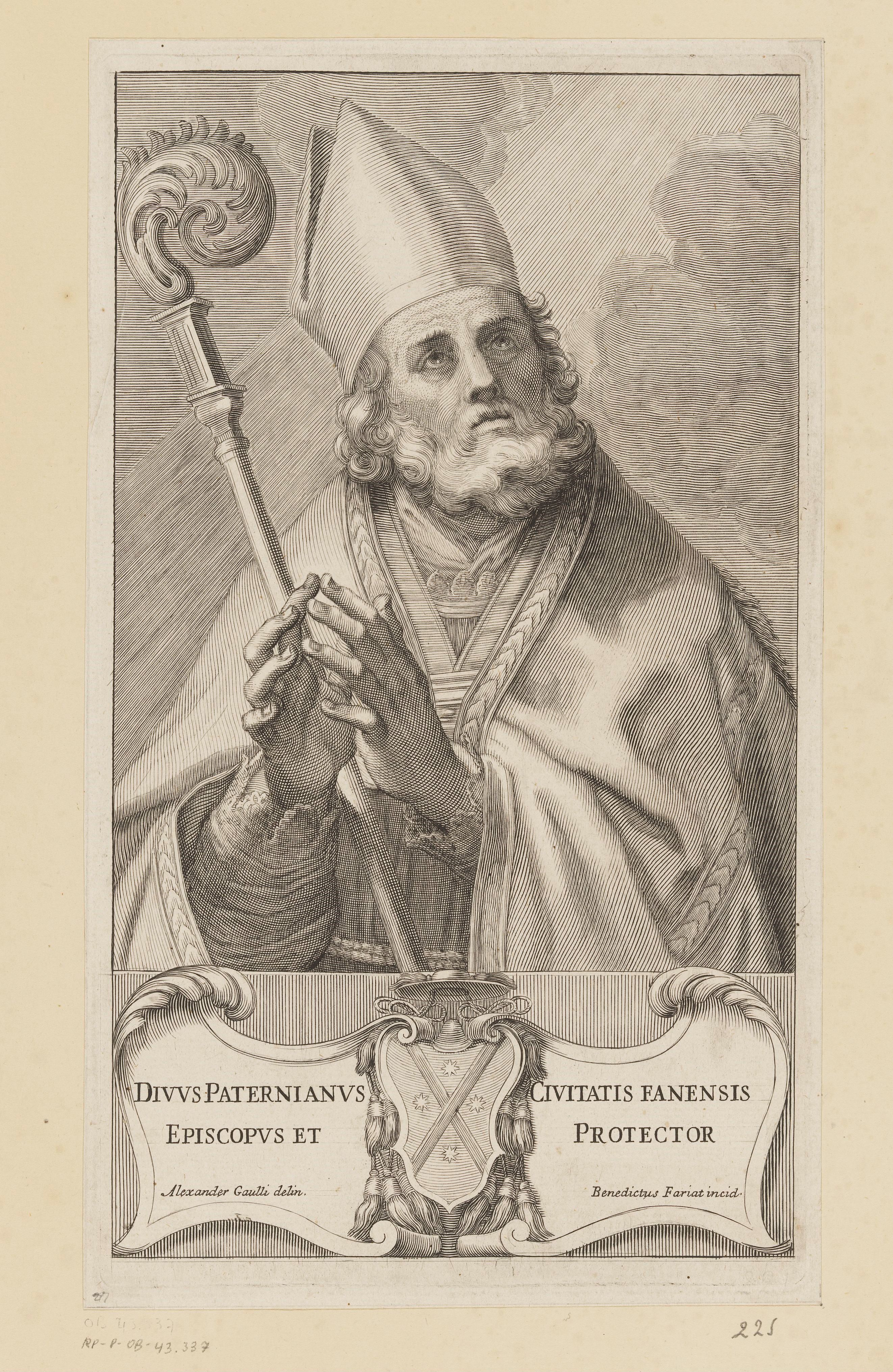
- Born: ~275 AD? Fano?
- Died: 13 November ~360 AD; Fano?
- Venerated in: Roman Catholic Church, Eastern Orthodox Church
- Major shrine: Fano
- Feast: 12 July; 13 November; 23 November
- Patronage: Cervia; Fano

Paternian or Paternianus (Italian: San Paterniano) is the name of an Italian saint. A native of Fermo who escaped to the mountains during the persecutions of Christians by Diocletian, he was then appointed bishop of Fano by Pope Sylvester I.

(Paternian is often confused with Parthenian (Parteniano), a bishop of Bologna, also commemorated on 12 July.)

== Life ==
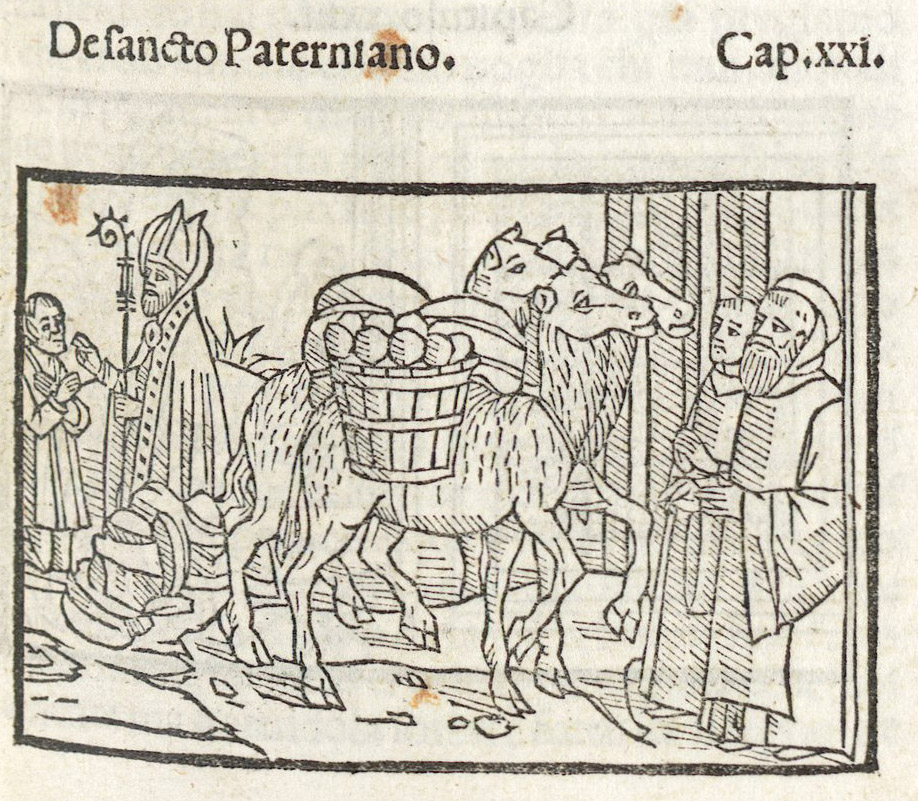
Saint Paternian in the Golden Legend (1497)

Historical details about Paternian are scarce. The Vita Sancti Paterniani can be found in a codex of the 12th century, though it dates earlier, and was written by a monk of the 10th or 11th century. But it is legendary and not reliable.

Paternian was born at Fano around 275 AD. An angel told him in a vision to escape this city and hide out in a deserted place near the Metauro River. He became a hermit and the abbot of a monastery. Later, when the persecution of Christians stopped, the citizens of Fano demanded that he become their bishop. Paternian governed the city for many years. He died on 13 November, around 360 AD. Miracles were reported at his tomb and his cult spread rapidly.

== Veneration ==
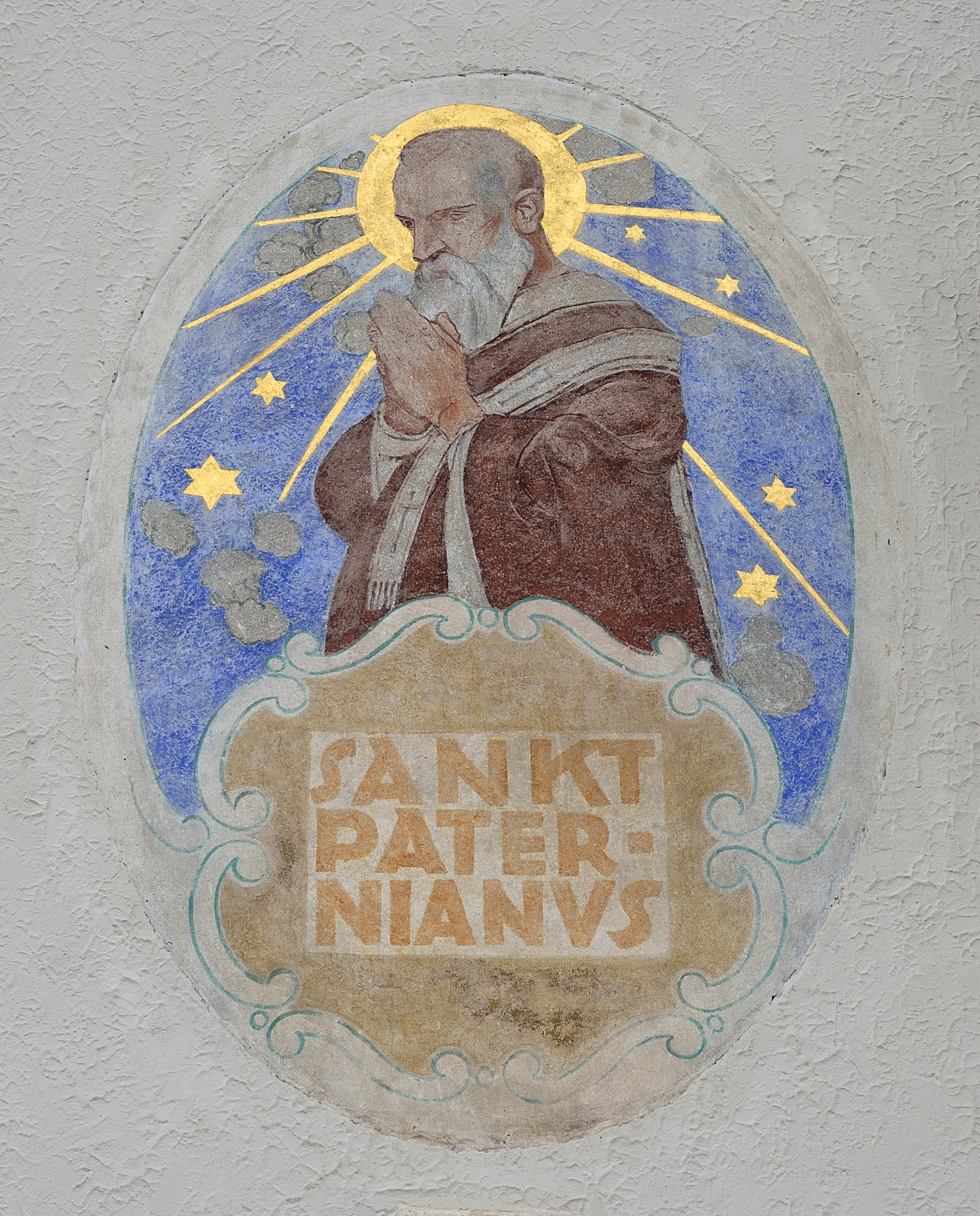
Rectory in Paternion, Carinthia. Medaillon with an image of Saint Paternian.

According to one legend, the inhabitants of Fano competed with those of Cervia for the body of the saint. Cervia would be left with a finger, while Fano would possess the rest of the saint's relics.

His cult spread across Marche, Romagna, Veneto, Tuscany, Umbria, and Dalmatia. In the area known as the Camminate di Fano, there is a cave known as the Grotta di San Paterniano, which is said to have been his refuge during the Diocletian persecution.

The Austrian town of Paternion takes its name from him. The name appears in documents for the first time in 1296, and its origin is derived from the fact that the area lay under the influence of the patriarchate of Aquileia.

There was an old proverb from Romagna that ran: "Par San Paternian e' trema la coda a e' can." ("On St. Paternian's day, the dog's tail wags"). This Cervian proverb refers to the fact that the cold began to be felt around the saint's feast day.
