= Fano =

- Comune
- Comune di Fano
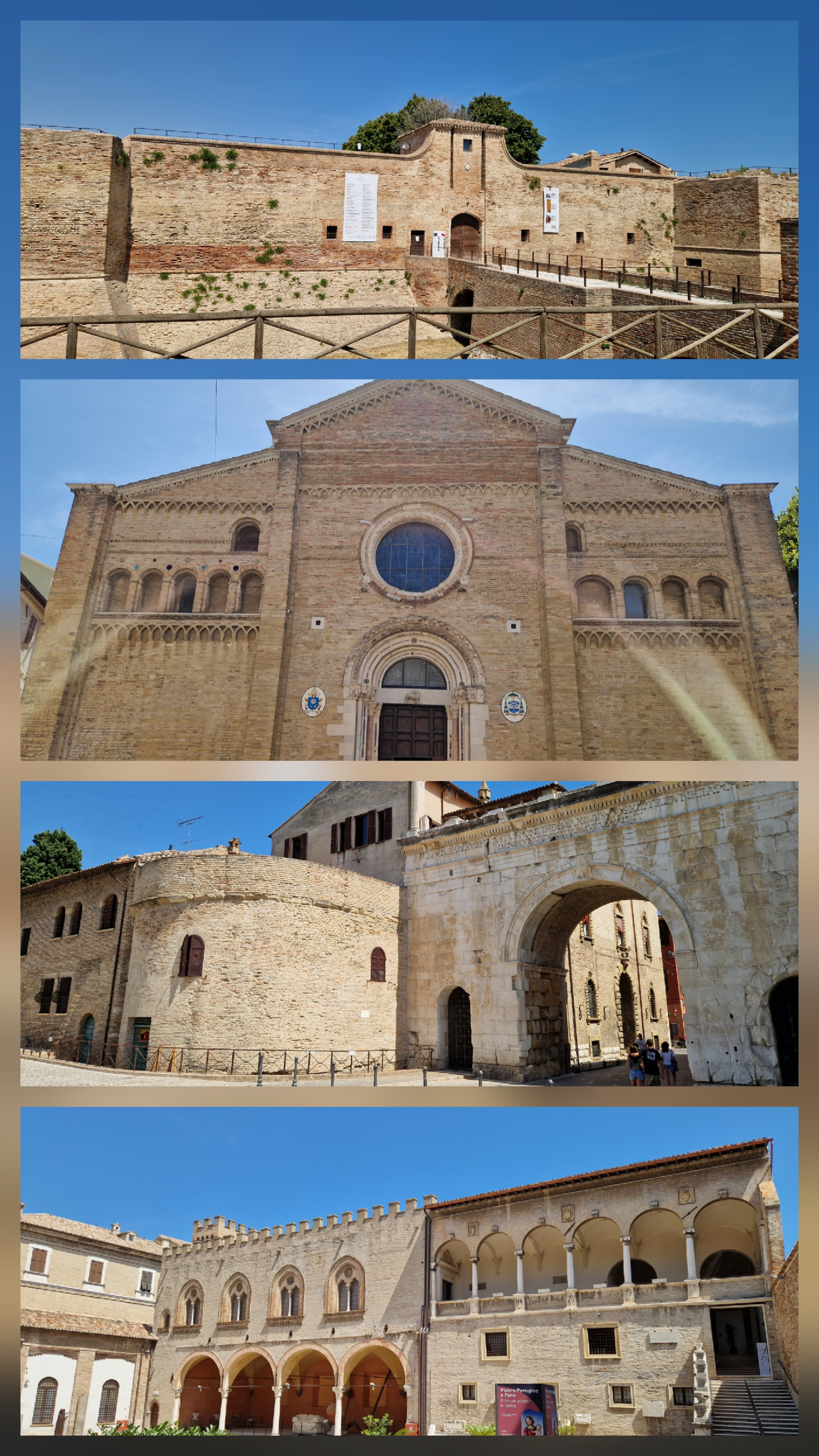
- From top to bottom: Castle, Cathedral, Arch of August, Palace of Dukes

- Coat of arms

- Fano within the Province of Pesaro-Urbino

- Location within Italy Location within Marche
- Coordinates: 43°50′33″N 13°00′49″E
- Country: Italy
- Region: Marche
- Province: Pesaro e Urbino (PU)
- Frazioni: Bellocchi, Caminate, Carignano, Carrara di Fano, Centinarola, Cuccurano, Falcineto, Fenile, Magliano, Marotta, Metaurilia, Ponte Sasso, Roncosambaccio, Rosciano, Sant'Andrea in Villis, Torrette di Fano, Tre Ponti

Government
  - Mayor: Luca Serfilippi (Lega)

Area
  - Total: 121 km^{2} (47 sq mi)
- Elevation: 12 m (39 ft)

Population (31 December 2017)
  - Total: 60,978
  - Density: 504/km^{2} (1,310/sq mi)
- Demonym: Fanesi
- Time zone: UTC+1 (CET)
  - Summer (DST): UTC+2 (CEST)
- Postal code: 61032
- Dialing code: 0721
- Patron saint: Saint Paternian
- Saint day: 10 July
- Website: Official website

Fano (Italian: [ˈfaːno]) is a coastal city and comune of the province of Pesaro and Urbino in the Marche region of Italy located 12 kilometres (7 miles) southeast of Pesaro at the point where the Via Flaminia reaches the Adriatic Sea. As of 2021, it has a population of approximately 59,000, smaller than Ancona and Pesaro.

== History ==
Originally part of ancient Marche, the settlement was known as Fanum Fortunae (‘Temple of Fortune’) after a prominent local sanctuary dedicated to the goddess Fortuna. Its first mention in history dates from 49 BC, when Julius Caesar held it, along with Pisaurum and Ancona. Caesar Augustus established a colonia, and built a wall, some parts of which remain. In 2 AD Augustus also built an arch (which is still standing) at the entrance to the town.

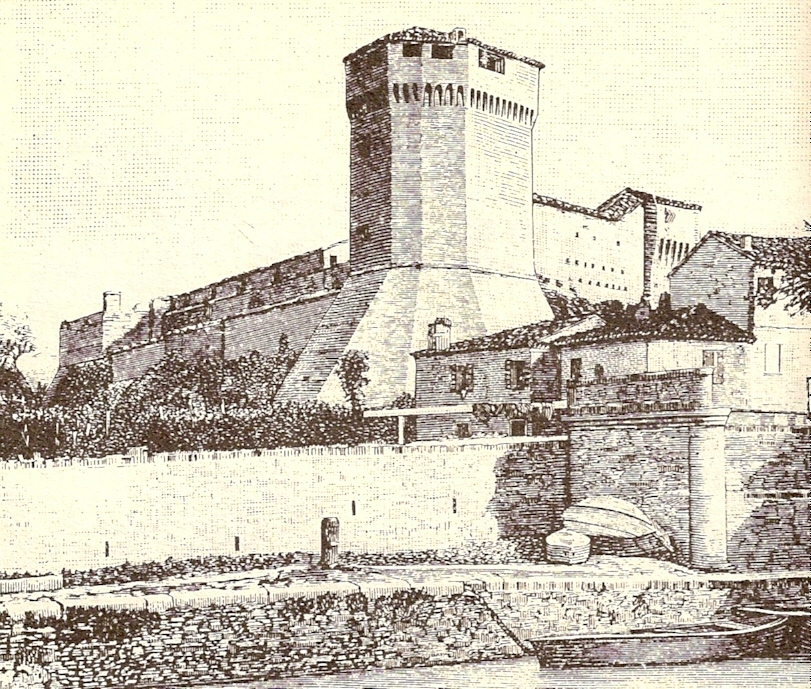
The Castle of Fano in a 19th-century etching. The high watchtower was destroyed during World War II.

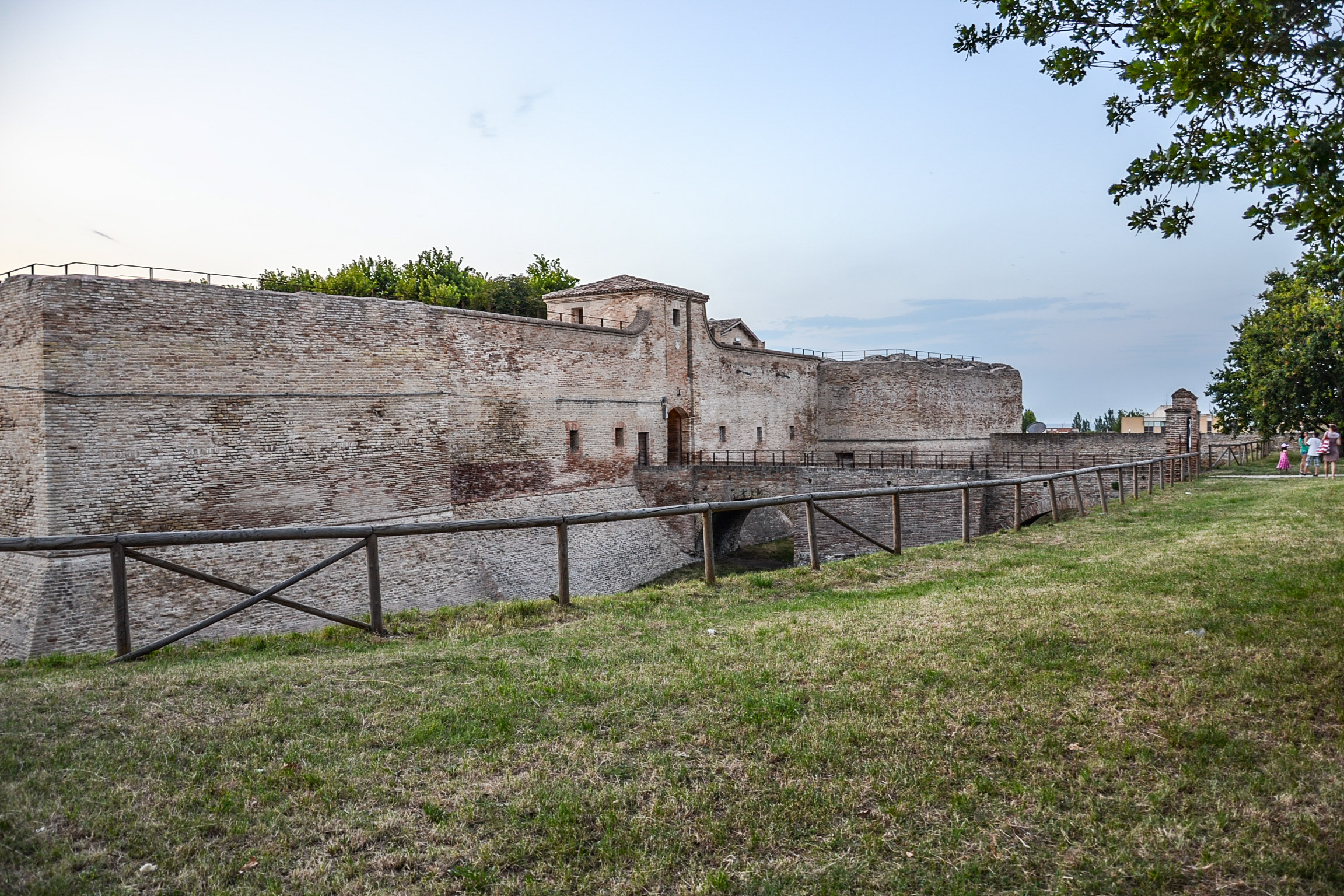
The Castle of Fano July 2011

In January 271, the Roman Army defeated the Alamanni in the Battle of Fano that took place on the banks of the Metauro river just inland of Fano.

Fano was destroyed by Vitiges' Ostrogoths in AD 538. It was rebuilt by the Byzantines, becoming the capital of the maritime Pentapolis ("Five Cities") that included also Rimini, Pesaro, Senigallia and Ancona. In 754 it was donated to the Holy See by the Frankish kings.

The Malatesta became lords of the city in 1356 with Galeotto I Malatesta, who was nominally only a vicar of the Popes. Among the others, Pandolfo III resided in the city. Under his son, the condottiero Sigismondo Pandolfo Malatesta, Fano was besieged by Papal troops under Federico III da Montefeltro, and returned to the Papal administration. It was later part of the short-lived state of Cesare Borgia, and then part of the duchy of the della Roveres in the Marche.

During the Napoleonic Wars it suffered heavy spoliations; the city had an active role in the Risorgimento. In World War I Fano was several times bombed by the Austro-Hungarian Navy. During World War II it was massively bombed by Allied aeroplanes due to hit the strategic railway and street bridges crossing the Metauro river. When the Nazis withdrew from the town they destroyed all of the bell towers in the town.

During the 1916 Rimini earthquakes, two spires of Fano Cathedral collapsed, a large stucco angel fell in the Church of Sant'Agostino, and part of the belltower wall of the Church of Santa Maria del Gonfalone collapsed. Part of a wall of the Church of San Paterniano collapsed. The earthquake of 16 August caused an exodus from the town.

In 2026, archaeological excavations in the piazza at Fano found the remains of the civic basilica described by Vitruvius in his treatise De architectura.

== Main sights ==
=== Religious structures ===
- Fano Cathedral: (12th century), which was erected over a pre-existing cathedral destroyed by a fire in 1111. The current façade is from the 1920s restoration, but is similar to the original. The interior has a nave and two aisles.
- The town's namesake temple of Fortuna is identified in the remains of a monumental podium located beneath the medieval convent of Saint Augustine.
- San Domenico
- San Pietro in Valle:
- San Paterniano: (16th century) with a Renaissance cloister.
- San Francesco: church housing the tombs of Pandolfo III Malatesta (designed by Leon Battista Alberti) and his first wife Paola Bianca Malatesta.
- Santa Maria Nuova: (1521) Church has an ancient portal and two works by Perugino (Annunciation of Fano and Fano Altarpiece, the latter including perhaps an intervention by Raphael).

Outside the city, in the place called Bellocchi, is the church of St. Sebastian (16th century), for the construction of which parts of the ancient cathedral were used.

=== Secular structures ===
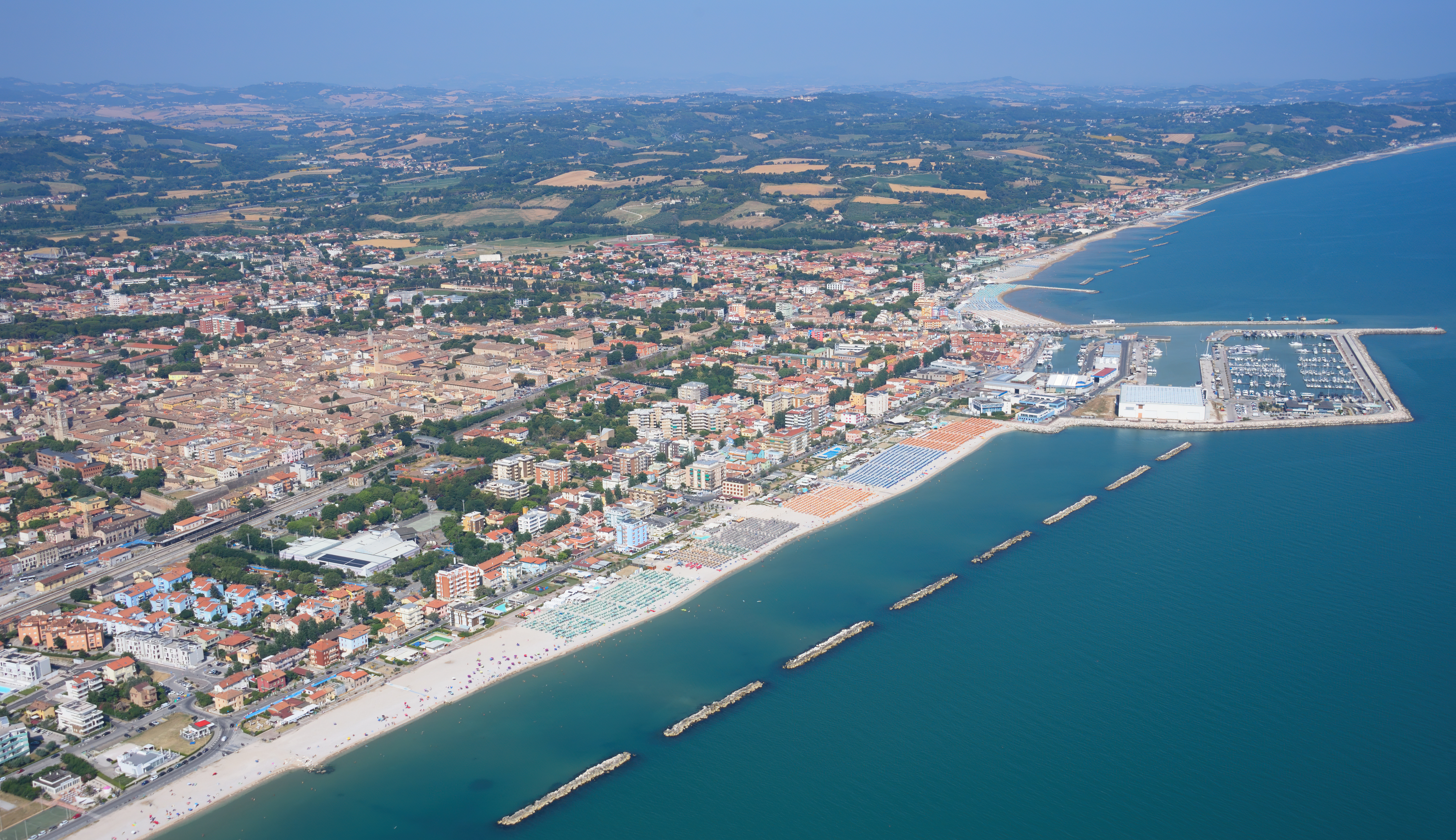
Aerial view of Fano

- Arco d'Augusto: The upper story of this Roman gate was destroyed in a siege conducted on the order of Pope Pius II in 1463, although a bas-relief of it was made by Bernardino di Pietro da Carona in 1513 on an adjacent wall of the annexed church and the loggia of St. Michael, the former having a noteworthy Renaissance portal.
- Corte Malatestiana: built after 1357 by Galeotto I Malatesta. The 14th-century section includes a great vaulted hall (probably part of the first residence of the Malatesta in the city) and a small turret. The modern part was built under Pandolfo III in 1413–23. The current edifice was heavily restored in the 20th century, but the original mullioned windows in Gothic style, as well as the staircase and the loggia from a 16th-century restoration. Also noteworthy is the Borgia-Cybo Arch (late 15th century). The palace is connected to the Palazzo del Podestà by a modern bridge, probably present also in the original structure.
- Rocca Malatestiana: (Malatesta Castle) was partially destroyed in 1944. The most ancient part dates probably from pre-existing Roman and medieval fortifications. The castle in its current form was begun in 1433 or 1438 by Sigismondo Pandolfo Malatesta. The now missing mastio was erected in 1452. Here, Sigismondo's son, Roberto, was besieged by Papal Troops in 1463 and signed the peace treaty that ended the Malatesta domination of Fano.
- Museo Civico of Fano: (Archeological Museum and Art Gallery), located inside the Palazzo Malatestiano, is a museum with archaeological findings, coins, medals, and an art gallery with works by Guido Reni, Domenichino, Guercino, Michele Giambono, and Giovanni Santi.
- Palazzo del Podestà or della Ragione (built from 1229 in Romanesque-Gothic style). The interiors are in Neoclassicist style, and it houses the Teatro della Fortuna.
- Fontana della Fortuna (Fountain of Fortune) (17th century).

== Culture ==
- Fano dei Cesari is an annual week-long festival held in July or August, featuring cultural events ending with a parade in Roman costumes and chariot races.
- The Fano Jazz by The Sea festival is held annually for one week.
- The library, the Biblioteca Federiciana, was established on 17 November 1720.

== Sports ==
The Fano Ultimate Frisbee Association, established in 2001, fields four teams—Croccali (mixed), Mirine (women), Spaccamadoni (men) and Angry Gulls (juniors)—and has won eight Italian championships.

Alma Juventus Fano 1906 is the local football team who play at the Stadio Raffaele Mancini.

== Notable people ==
- Sebastiano Ceccarini (1703–83), painter
- Clement VIII, Ippolito Aldobrandini (1536–1605), pope
- Menahem Azariah da Fano (1548, Fano – Mantua, 1620), famed Rabbi and Kabbalist
- Antonio Giuglini (1825–65), opera tenor
- Fathi Hassan (born 1957), artist
- Carlo Magini (1720–1806), painter
- Francesco Magini (c. 1668-1670–1714), composer
- Roberto Malatesta (c. 1441-1442–1482), condottiero and lord of Rimini
- Laura Martinozzi (1639–87), duchess, mother of Mary of Modena
- Bruno Radicioni (1933–97), painter, sculptor and ceramist
- Ruggero Ruggeri (1871–1953), actor
- Giacomo Torelli (1608–78), set designer
- Franco Trappoli, Mayor of Fano (1980–83) and first Buddhist member of the Italian Parliament

== Twin towns – sister cities ==
Fano is twinned with:

- Gandia, Spain
- Mladá Boleslav, Czech Republic
- Rastatt, Germany
- St Albans, England, United Kingdom
- Stříbro, Czech Republic
- Wieliczka, Poland

== See also ==
- Roman Catholic Diocese of Fano-Fossombrone-Cagli-Pergola
- Fano railway station
- Fano Airfield
