= Sebastiano Ceccarini =

Italian painter

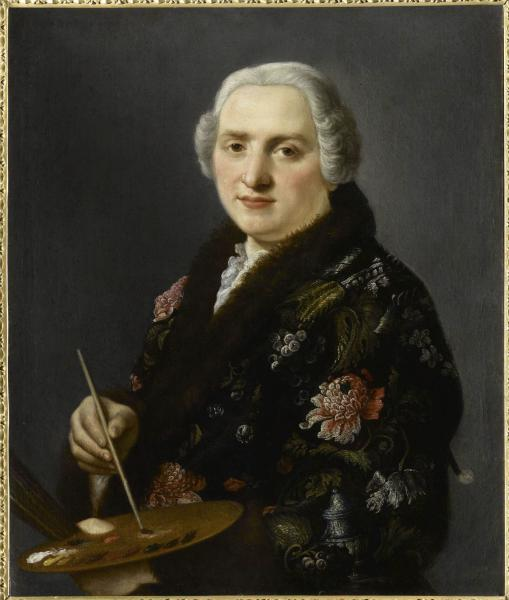
- Self-portrait, Musée Fesch, Ajaccio
- Born: May 17, 1703; Fano, Papal States
- Died: August 26, 1783 (aged 80); Fano, Papal States
- Education: Francesco Mancini
- Known for: Painting
- Movement: Baroque

Sebastiano Ceccarini (17 May 1703 – 26 August 1783) was an Italian Baroque painter. He was a student of Francesco Mancini and the teacher of his nephew Carlo Magini.

== Life ==
Sebastiano Ceccarini was born in Fano on 17 maggio 1703. Aged 14, he entered the studio of Francesco Mancini, collaborating with him at Foligno, Rome and Perugia. From 1724, when he followed Mancini to Rome, his movements are documented. His first stay in the city, which coincided with a long period of study, ended in 1729, but he was again in Rome from 1731 to 1735 and from 1744 to 1754, after travelling to Pesaro, Urbino, Perugia, Bologna, Venice and Florence. From 1755, he alternated long periods in Fano, where he remained active into old age, with short stays in Rome. In the early 1780s, he retired with a stipend paid by the town of Fano. He died in Fano on 26 August 1783, aged 80.

== Work ==
Ceccarini first assimilated the grand manner of such 17th-century artists from Rome as Domenichino, Reni and Maratta, both directly and through Mancini’s teaching, as well as the various trends in contemporary painting. His artistic individuality was confirmed, however, from the 1720s, particularly in the fields of portraiture and altarpieces. He adopted the formula of courtly ceremonial portraiture, where the grandiosity of the settings and the rigidity of the poses are redeemed by his technical skill and the brilliant description of the clothes and furnishings. In his vast output he depicted ecclesiastical figures (e.g. Cardinal Fabrizio Spada, 1754; Rome, Galleria Spada) and produced such secular portraits as those of the Gabuccini Family (Fano, Pinacoteca Civica e Museo Malatestiano) as well as the Self-portrait while Painting his Daughter, a Nun (1773; Fano, Pinacoteca Civica e Museo Malatestiano).

In the field of religious painting, Ceccarini followed the classicism of Mancini, whose refined chromatic harmonies he also captured; however, he replaced his teacher’s solemn and cultured style with an affable, accessible narrative tone that transformed the religious subject into a hagiographical anecdote, in line with the naturalism of Aureliano Milani, Jacopo Zoboli and Marco Benefial. While his youthful works repeated Mancini’s moderate classical compositions (e.g. the Virgin Appearing to St Rocco, 1732; Fano, Pinacoteca Civica e Museo Malatestiano), his production from the 1740s seems more original.

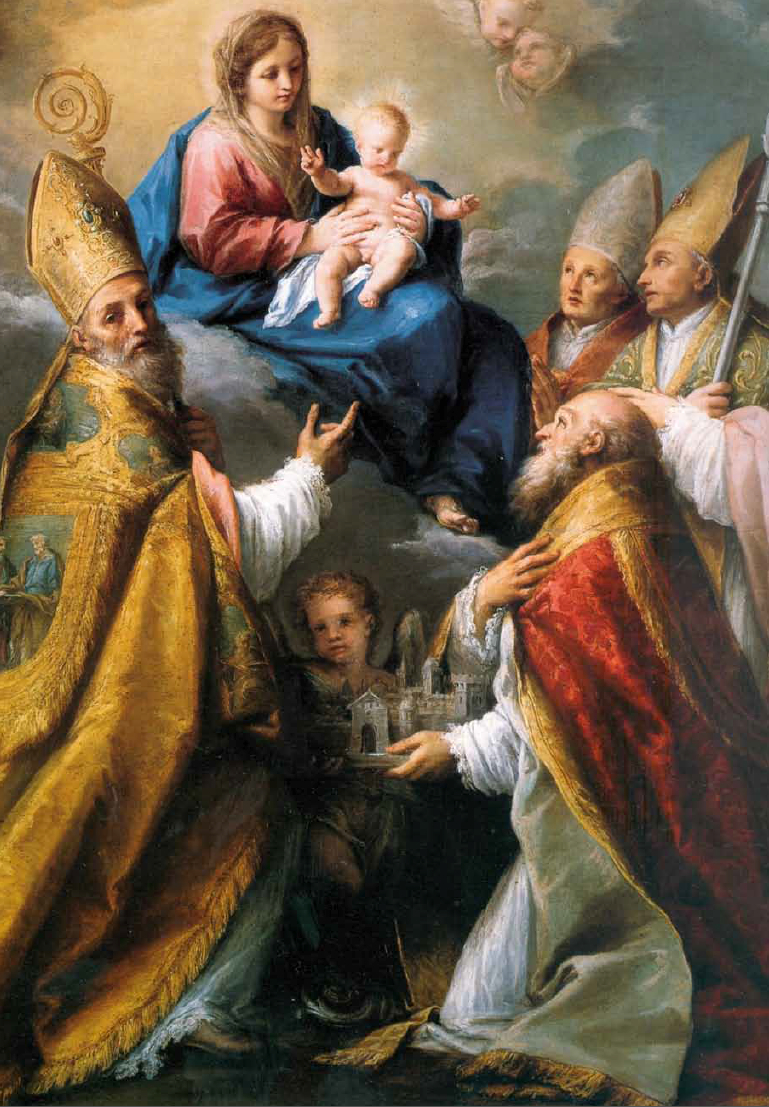
The Virgin entrusts the city of Fano to four protective saints, Cappella Alavolini, Fano

As well as the numerous canvases in the Pinacoteca Civica e Museo Malatestiano and the churches of Fano, he executed works for Roman patrons, some of which have been traced, for example, the Appearance of the Virgin to St. Leo the Great (1750; Rome, Santa Maria Maggiore).

Ceccarini also practised wall painting, a medium in which he obtained only mediocre results, for example, the Assumption of the Virgin (1741; Rome, Santi Sergio e Bacco). He also painted altarpieces, for example, the Madonna and Child with St. Francis and St. Sebastian and the Castle of Mondolfo in the Background, for the church of San Sebastiano in Mondolfo.

A versatile artist, Cerracini also attempted biblical themes interpreted in the style of popular melodrama (e.g. Judith and Holofernes, 1770; Fano, Pinacoteca Civica e Museo Malatestiano), and he experimented with still-lifes: numerous small canvases of flowers, fruits and animals exist in private collections in Fano.

Ceccarini’s son Giuseppe Ceccarini (1742–1811) produced paintings heavily influenced by those of his father.

== Works ==
- Portrait of a Noblewoman (c. 1750), Walters Art Museum, Baltimore
- Assumption (c. 1750), Church of SS. Sergius and Bacchus, Rome
- Allegory of the Five Senses, 1748, Milan, Altomani collection
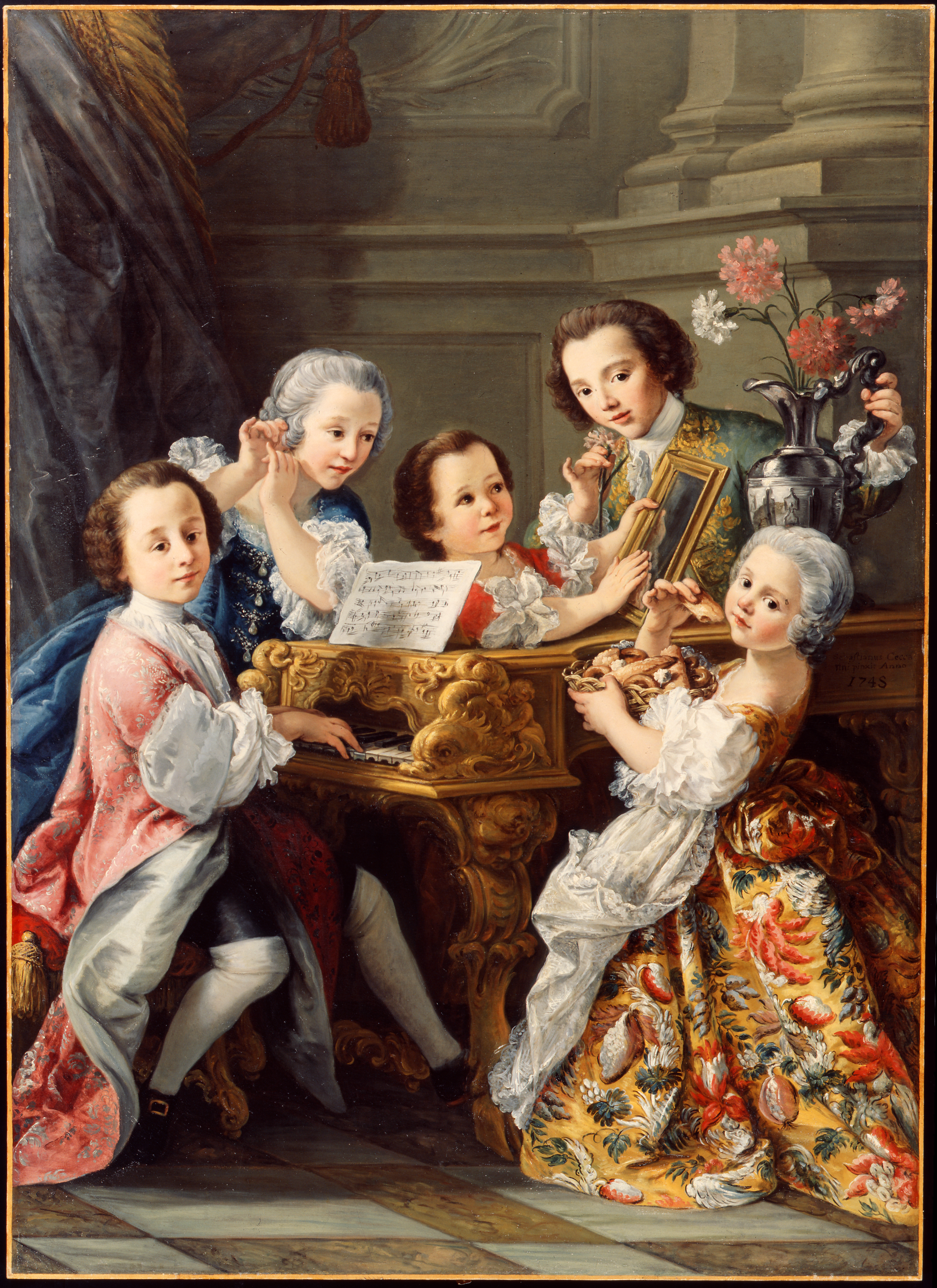
Allegory of Five Senses, Milan, Altomani collection

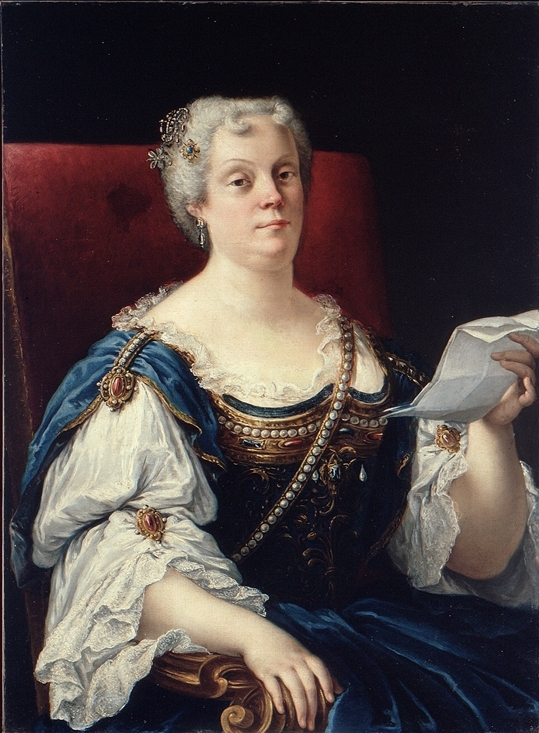
Portrait of a lady, Palazzo Malatestiano, Pesaro

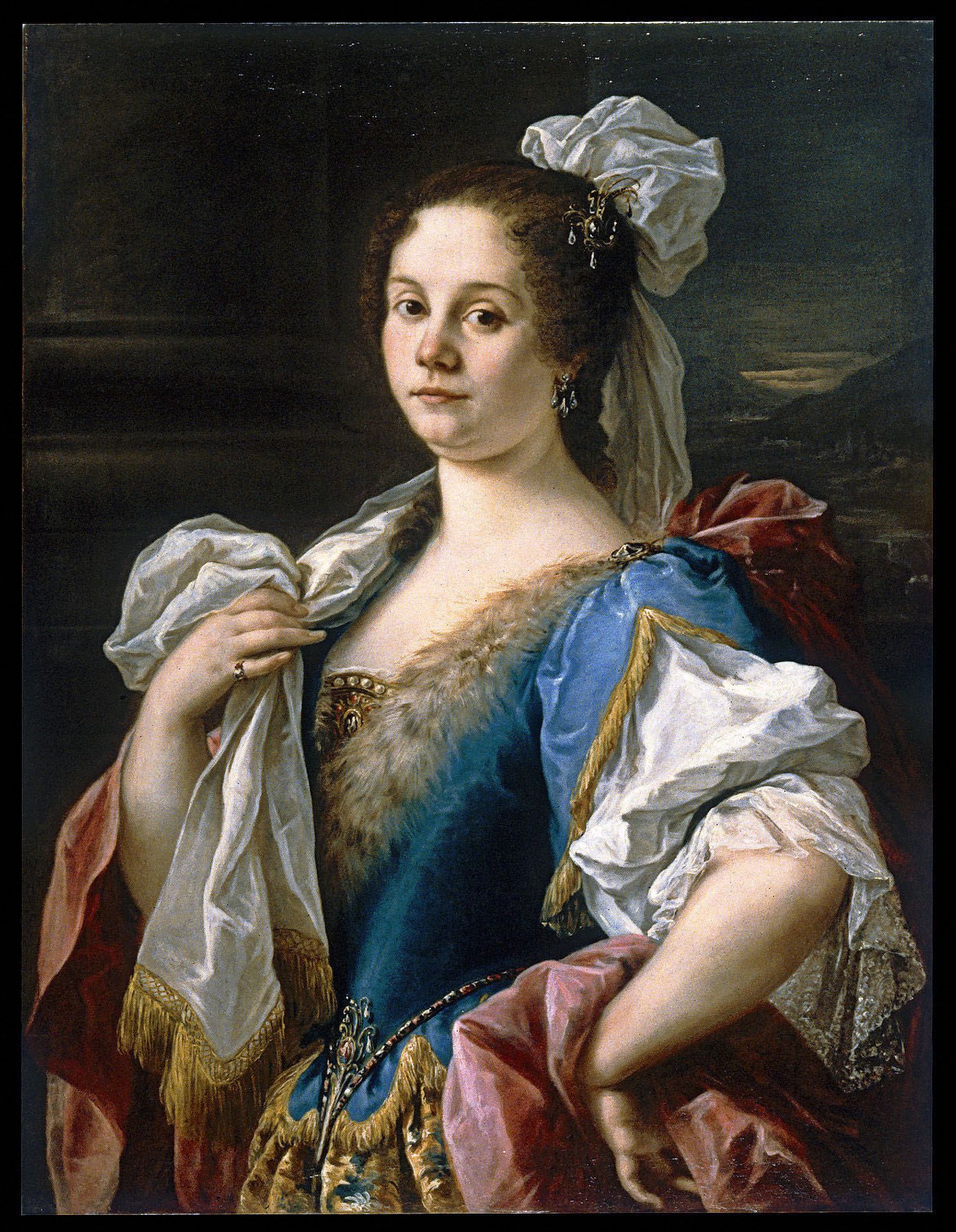
Portrait of a Noblewoman, Walters Art Museum, Baltimore, Maryland

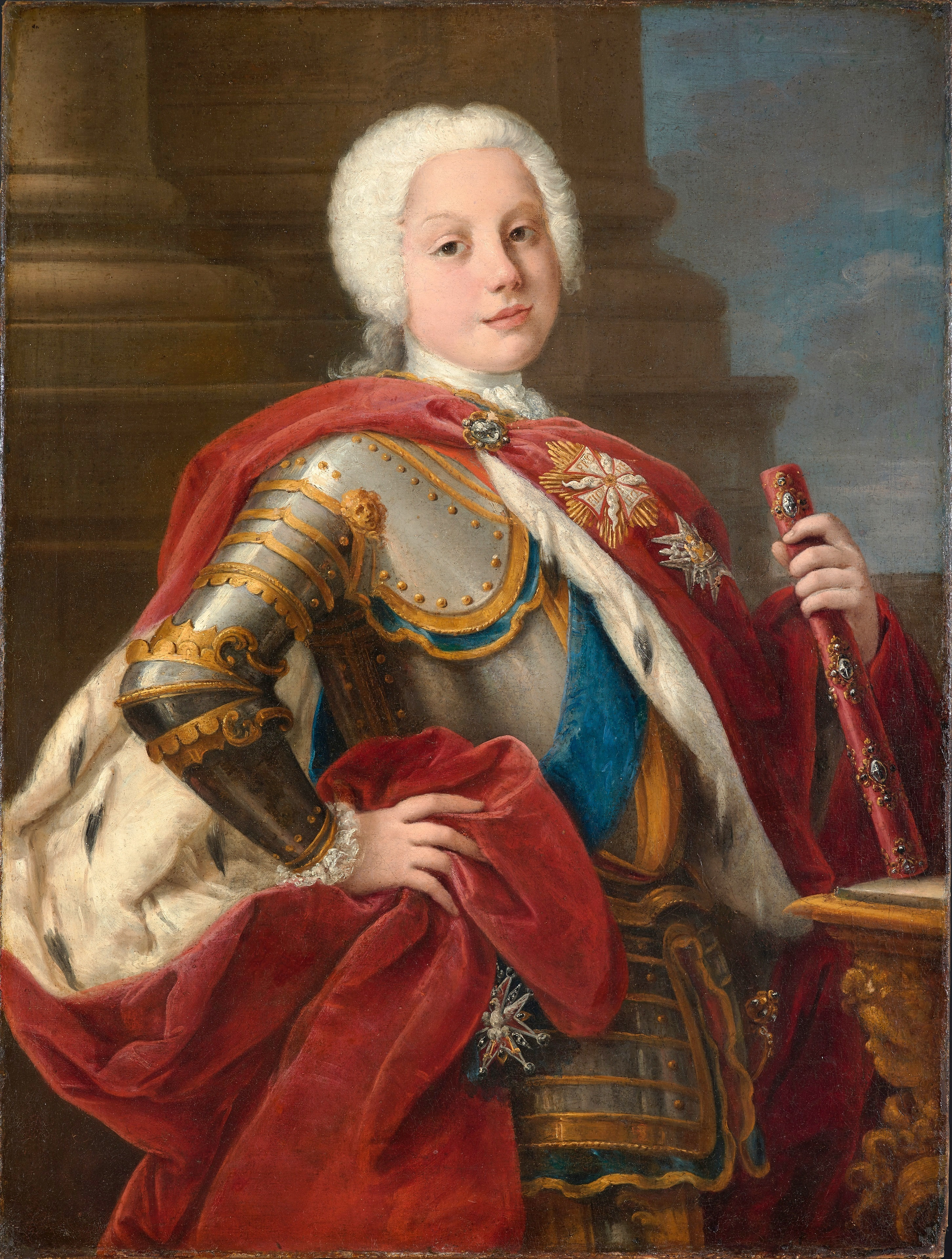
Portrait of Frederick Christian of Saxony, Royal Castle, Warsaw

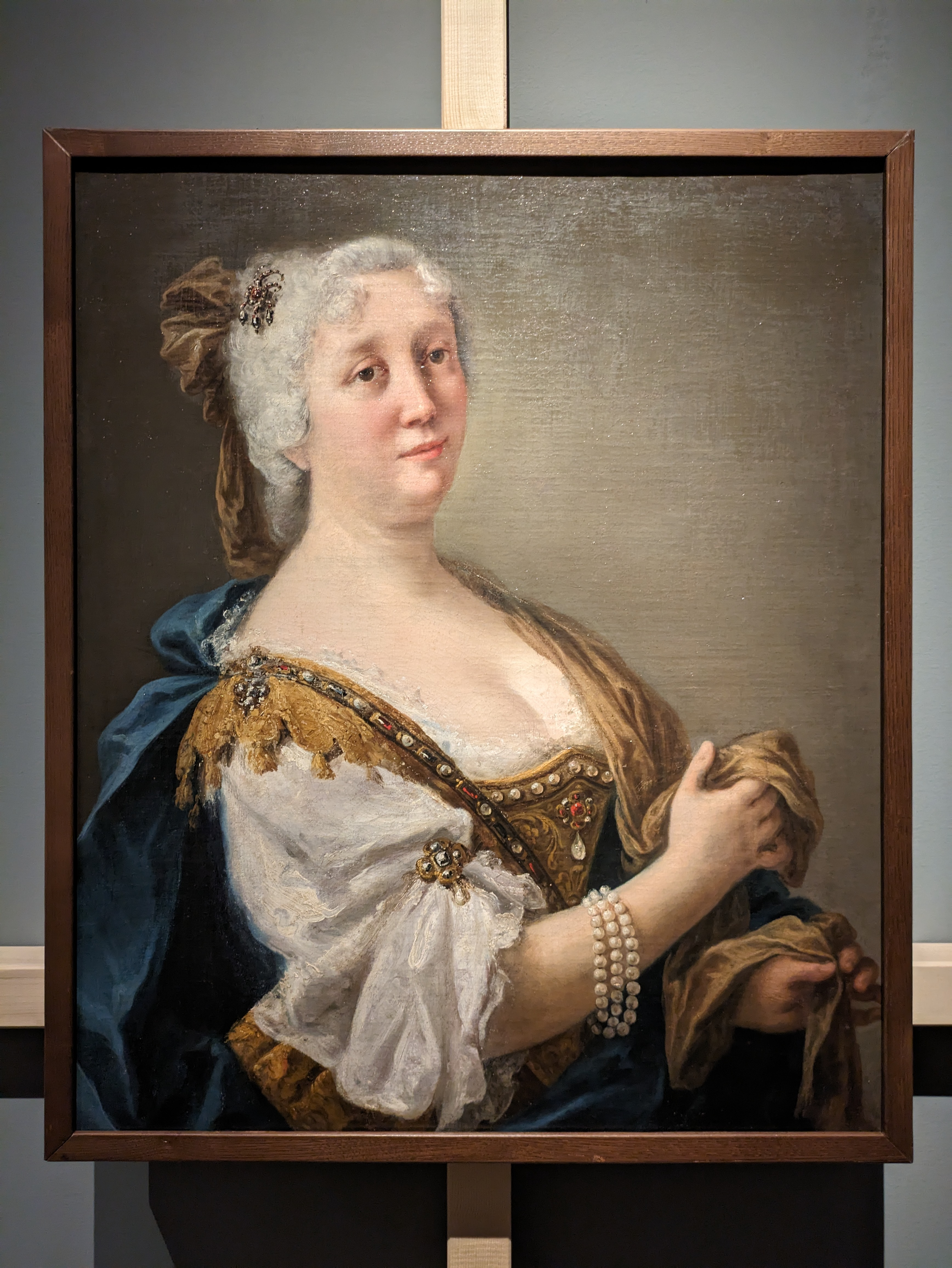
Portrait of a Noblewoman, priv. col.

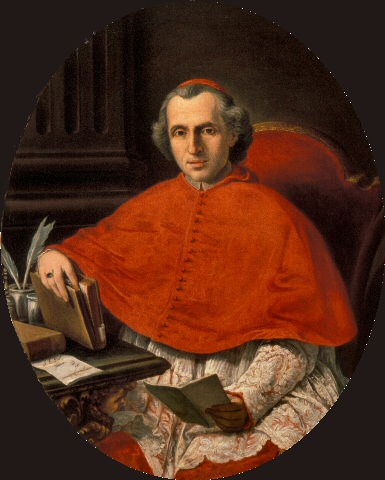
Portrait of Cardinal Gaetano Fantuzzi, Fondazione San Carlo, Modena
