= Pacificus of San Severino =

Italian Roman Catholic priest

Saint Pacificus of San Severino O.F.M.
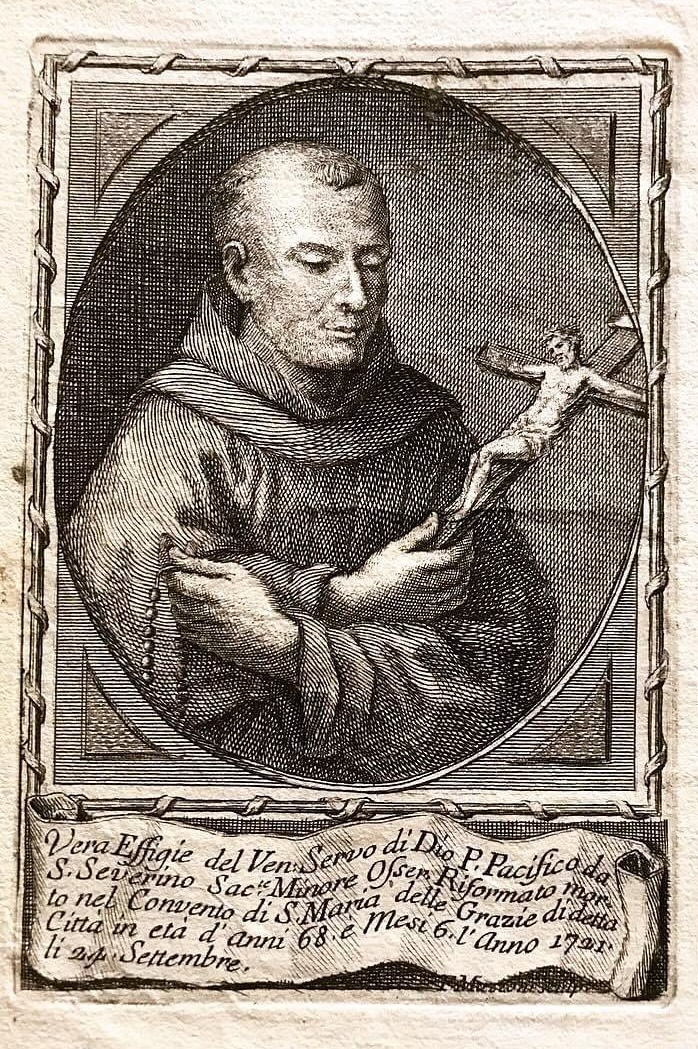

Priest
- Born: 1 March 1653; San Severino, Macerata, Papal States
- Died: 24 September 1721 (aged 68); San Severino, Macerata, Papal States
- Venerated in: Roman Catholic Church
- Beatified: 4 August 1786, Saint Peter's Basilica, Papal States by Pope Pius VI
- Canonized: 26 May 1839, Saint Peter's Basilica, Papal States by Pope Gregory XVI
- Feast: 24 September
- Attributes: Franciscan habit
- Patronage: San Severino Marche

Pacificus of San Severino (1 March 1653 – 24 September 1721), born Carlo Antonio Divini, was an Italian Roman Catholic priest known for being a miracle-worker.

Contemporary Catholic sources in English use the name "Pacific".

He was beatified on 4 August 1786, and canonized as a saint in 1839.

== Life ==
Carlo Antonio Divini was born at San Severino as the youngest of thirteen children of the nobles Antonio Maria and Mariangela Bruni Divini. His parents died not long after his Confirmation when he was aged three. He was raised by his maternal uncle Luzizio Bruni, archdeacon of the Cathedral of San Severino, a good and cultured man, but far too strict to care for a small child. In December 1670 he took the Franciscan habit in the Order of the Reformati at Forano in the March of Ancona, taking the name "Pacificus".

Pacificus was ordained to the priesthood on 4 June 1678 and served as professor of philosophy for the next six years for the newer members of the order at Fossombrone. Following this he worked for four or five years as a missionary in the surrounding area. He is described as "... tall, thin man with pale skin, an eagle nose, a clear voice and a modest and friendly appearance."

Although in poor health, he walked a good part of central-northern Italy to preach. In 1684, his health began to fail. Suffering lameness and deafness in addition to blindness he was unable to continue giving missions and then cultivated the contemplative life. Subject all his life long to intense bodily pains, "he sought for comfort and relief in God alone, and was by him favoured with marvellous supernatural graces and with the gift of working miracles". He was said to have "borne his ills with angelic patience, worked several miracles, and was favoured by God with ecstasies". It is said that he predicted the terrible earthquake that devastated Abruzzo in 1703.

Despite chronic ill health, he moved between the monasteries of San Severino and Forano, holding responsible positions in both places. From 1692 to 1693, he held the post of Guardian in the convent of Santa Maria delle Grazie in San Severino, where he later died on 24 September 1721.

== Veneration ==
Crowds turned out for his funeral and miracles were soon reported at his grave. In 1725 his mortal remains were placed in the abbey church.

The canonization process commenced in 1740 under Pope Benedict XIV, in a move that accorded him the title of Servant of God as the first stage. Pope Pius VI beatified him on 4 August 1786. The following year, Pacificus' relics were covered by a wax figure, placed in a glass coffin and moved to a chapel built in his honor. Pope Gregory XVI canonized him on 26 May 1839. His feast is celebrated on 24 September. Pacificus is considered the patron saint of those with chronic pain.

Locations named in honor of Pacificus are relatively few; one church in North America, a chapel in Humphrey, New York, bears his name. The Latin Catholic Church of Büyükada [Prinkipo] in Istanbul, Turkey, called San Pacifico Latin Catholic Church, is dedicated to Pacificus.
