= Antonio Bonfigli =

Italian painter and architect (1806–1865)

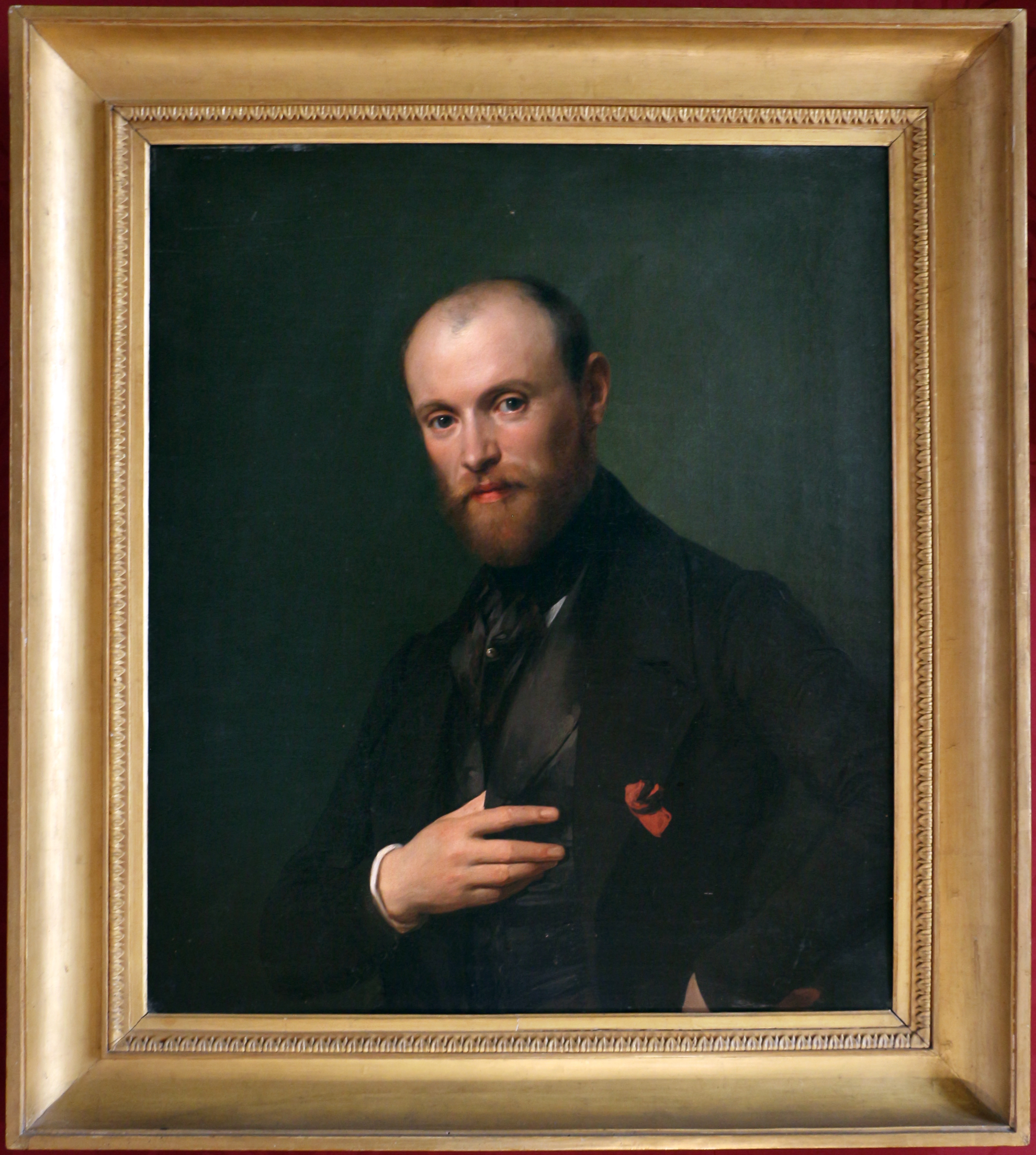
Francesco Podesti, Ritratto di Antonio Bonfigli - Musei civici di Palazzo Buonaccorsi

Antonio Bonfigli (1806–1865) was an Italian painter, architect, and miniaturist.

Antonio was born in Macerata, and studied there first under Atanasio Favini. In 1826, he moved to Rome to study under Vincenzo Camuccini and then Ferdinando Cavalleri. Antonio developed a practice in Rome, restoring old canvases and creating illuminated manuscripts. He participated in the Exposition of the Accademia Ligustica with some of his manuscripts and copies of ancient works. In 1860, upon returning to his native Macerata, the helped found the local Pinacoteca Civica. In the galleries, two of his canvases, a copy of The Transfiguration (original by Raphael) and Portrait of Pius VII are on display. He died in Macerata.
