= Madonna with Child (Crivelli) =

Painting by Carlo Crivelli

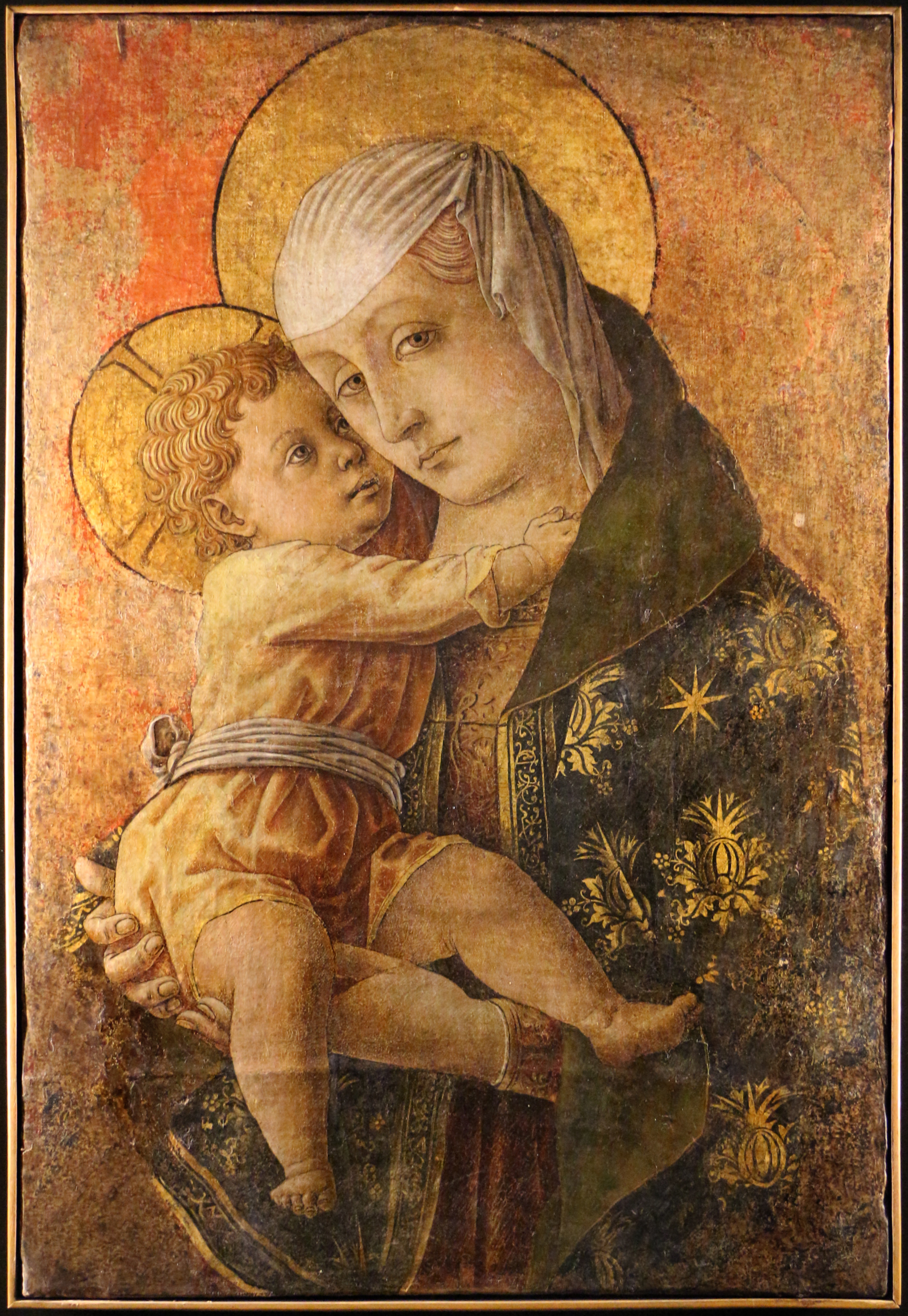
- Artist: Carlo Crivelli
- Year: c. 1470
- Medium: tempera and gold on panel, transferred to canvas
- Dimensions: 59 cm × 40 cm (23 in × 16 in)
- Location: Pinacoteca di Macerata; Macerata

The Madonna with Child is a tempera and gold on panel painting, transferred to canvas, by the Italian Renaissance artist Carlo Crivelli. It is a Madonna painting dating to c. 1470.

It was painted with tempera on wood, and centuries later transferred to canvas. It was a piece of an altar in the Church of the Osservanti in Macerata, Marche, Italy. It is now located in the Pinacoteca di Macerata.

== See also ==
- Roman Catholic Marian art
