= Santa Maria delle Grazie, San Severino Marche =

Church in San Severino Marche, Italy

Santa Maria delle Grazie is a Roman Catholic church located on Via San Pacifico Divini in San Severino Marche, region of Marche, Italy.

== History ==
Originally this was a 12th-century. Augustinian church and convent, named Santa Maria sub Monte Aria. In the fifteenth century, the property was transferred to the Franciscan order of Friars Minor Observant, who changed the name to Santa Maria delle Grazie.

The church was rebuilt several times, the Count Severino Servanzi Collio patronized a restoration and creation of the sanctuary following the 19th-century canonization of the 7th-century figure, the blessed Pacifico. The sanctuary and tomb is located in the chapel to the right of the entrance.

A new Neoclassic facade was designed in 1842 by Ireneo Aleandri with a steeple designed by Venancio Bigioli. Embedded into the facade as a decorative element is one of the original Romanesque-Gothic carved portals with plant and animal sculptural decorations. Among the works in the interior, include a main altarpiece canvas by Bernardino di Mariotto depicting the Madonna and St John with a genuflecting Mary Magdalen an St Bernardine.

== Sanctuary of San Pacifico ==
Adjacent to the convent is the sanctuary which retains the highly sculpted Gothic-Romanesque portal. The façade of this church was rebuilt in the 19th century by design of Ireneo Aleandri. The sanctuary contains the relics of San Pacifico Divino.
