= Sferisterio di Macerata =

- Arena Sferisterio
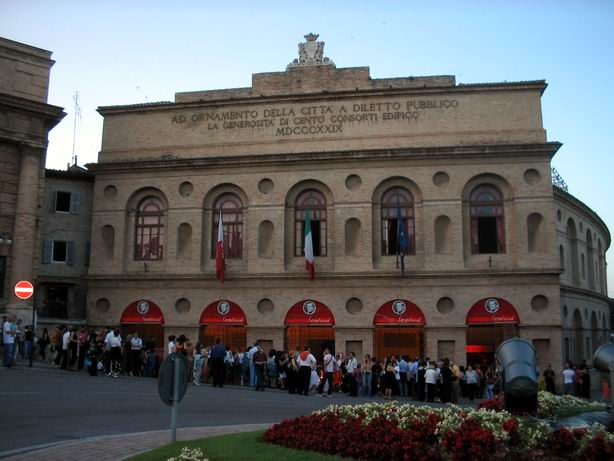
- Interactive map of Sferisterio di Macerata
- Location: Macerata, Italy
- Coordinates: 43°17′58″N 13°27′22″E
- Capacity: 3,000
- Field size: 36 x 90 m

Construction
- Groundbreaking: 1823
- Opened: 1829
- Architect: Ireneo Aleandri

Website
- Official Website

The Sferisterio is an open-air stadium or sphaeristerium in Macerata, Italy.

== History ==
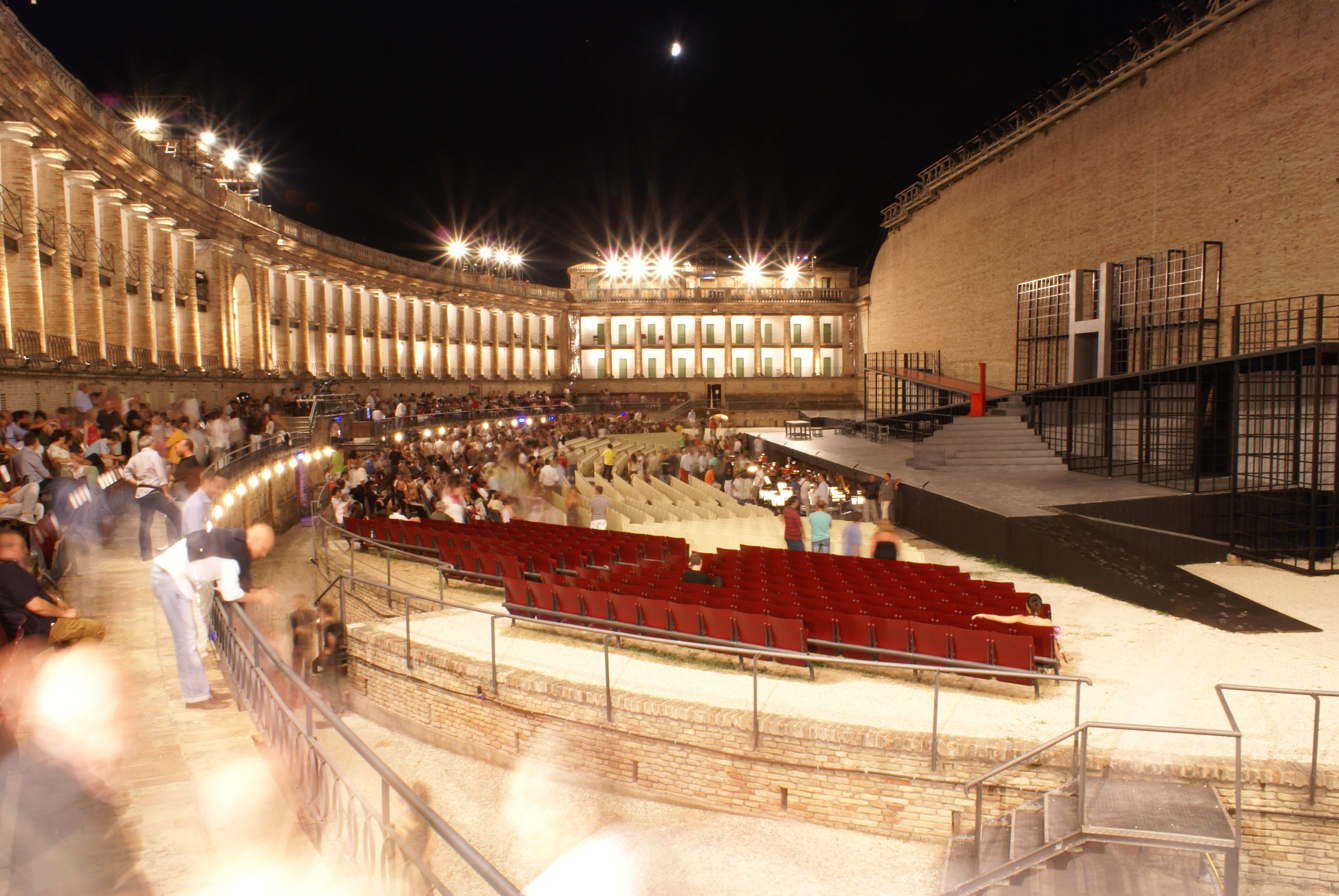
Seating area of the Arena Sferisterio

An ancient Italian national sport or pallone col bracciale was the most popular sport in Italy for almost five centuries. This game dated back to the 15th century. The people of Macerata decided that they needed somewhere large to play and watch it; a place that could also be used for public spectacles such as circuses and even bull fights. One hundred citizens raised the money themselves, and got Ireneo Aleandri to design and build it in 1823. The design involved the destruction and rebuilding of some of the historic city walls next to the Porta Mercato gate.

It took about six years to complete the building.

The strait side of the arena is a wall 18 metres high and 88 metres long, along which is a line of arches separated by 56 columns carrying a double row of boxes, and a stone gallery, all in Neoclassical style.

Over the years the popularity of pallone decreased and that of football replaced it. In 1919 the surface was levelled to allow for this, and also for tennis courts. The arena had been used for the occasional theatrical event from 1871, but from about 1921 opera began to be put on there.

=== Present day use ===
In 1921, as the first presentation of what would become the Sferisterio Opera Festival, Pieralberto Conti staged Verdi's Aida paid for by the soprano, Francisca Solari. This was followed by all parts of the arena, both front- and back-stage, being renovated and electricity introduced.

Today it holds an audience of over 3,000. The stage is 14.5 meters deep and 40 meters wide, with 10 meter wings each side of that. It is rather unusual shape for musical performances (musicians at each end of the pit cannot hear each other) but the acoustics are surprisingly good (at least near the middle).

The present day opera festival, beginning in the late 1980s and under the auspices of the Macerata Opera, takes place in this location.

== See also ==
- Macerata Opera and the Sferisterio Opera Festival
- Pallone
