= Teatro Ventidio Basso =

Coordinates: 42°51′20.3″N 13°34′29.21″E

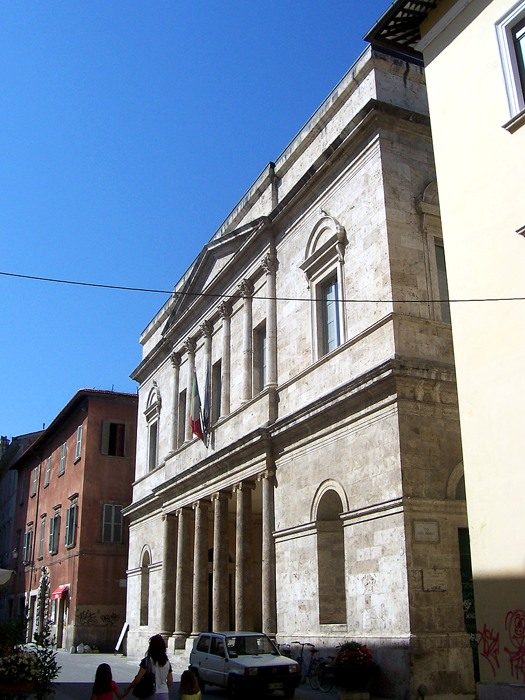
- Theater facade
- Interactive map of Teatro Ventidio Basso
- Address: Ascoli Piceno; Italy

UNESCO World Heritage Site
- Official name: Teatro Ventidio Basso
- Part of: The system of Italian-style condominio theatres of the 18th and 19th centuries in Central Italy
- Criteria: Cultural: iii
- Reference: 1762
- Inscription: 2026 (48th Session)

The Ventidio Basso Theater is the communal theater, concert hall, and opera house in the city of Ascoli Piceno region of Marche, Italy. It is located on via del Trivio, in front main cloister of the church of San Francesco, near piazza del Popolo. The exterior was erected in neoclassical-style, with grand interiors.

== History ==
Ascoli Piceno had a communal theater since 1579, located at the site of the palazzo Anzianale. In 1839, the then-existing Teatro Comunale di Legno closed for performances. In order to build a larger arena, a design was commissioned in 1827 from Ireneo Aleandri and construction pursued from 1840 to 1846, when it stopped due to lack of funds. However construction was then sponsored by the engineer Marco Massimi and the merchant Gabriele Gabrielli, and directed by the architect Giambattista Carducci.

The facade is sober with an entrance through an ionic colonnade. The second floor has a temple front tympanum with pilasters. The atrium is decorated with stucco statues by Giorgio and Emidio Paci, depicting Apollo and Minerva, the muses of tragedy, comedy, music, and dance. The theater ceiling was decorated by Ferdinando Cicconi, with medallions depicting Donizetti, Rossini, Bellini, and Verdi. Cesare Recanatini painted for the Theater a curtain a Vedute of the Piazza del Popolo. Another sipario depicts the Triumph of Ventidio Basso for his Victory over the Parthians by Vincenzo Podesti (brother of Francesco). The theater has four rows of balconies with seating for over 800 spectators.

In 1846, the first performances were of the operas of Ernani and I Puritani, with the soprano Anna De la Grange, in leading roles. She is one of the busts in the atrium. Refurbishments over the years include electric lighting (1907) and cinema projector (1917). The theater was closed for restoration in 1979, to re-open only in 1994. Recently, the theater has hosted performances from the Rete Lirica delle Marche.

In July 2026, the condominio theatres of the 18th and 19th centuries in Central Italy (including Teatro Ventidio Basso) were designated by UNESCO as a World Heritage Site.

== Name ==
The theater is named for Ventidio Basso, a prisoner during the Social Wars of the Roman Republic. He became a military and political leader for Julius Caesar and Marc Antony. Ventidio was honored with a triumph for a victory against the Parthians in 38-39 B.C.
