= Teatro Lauro Rossi =

Opera house in Macerata, Italy

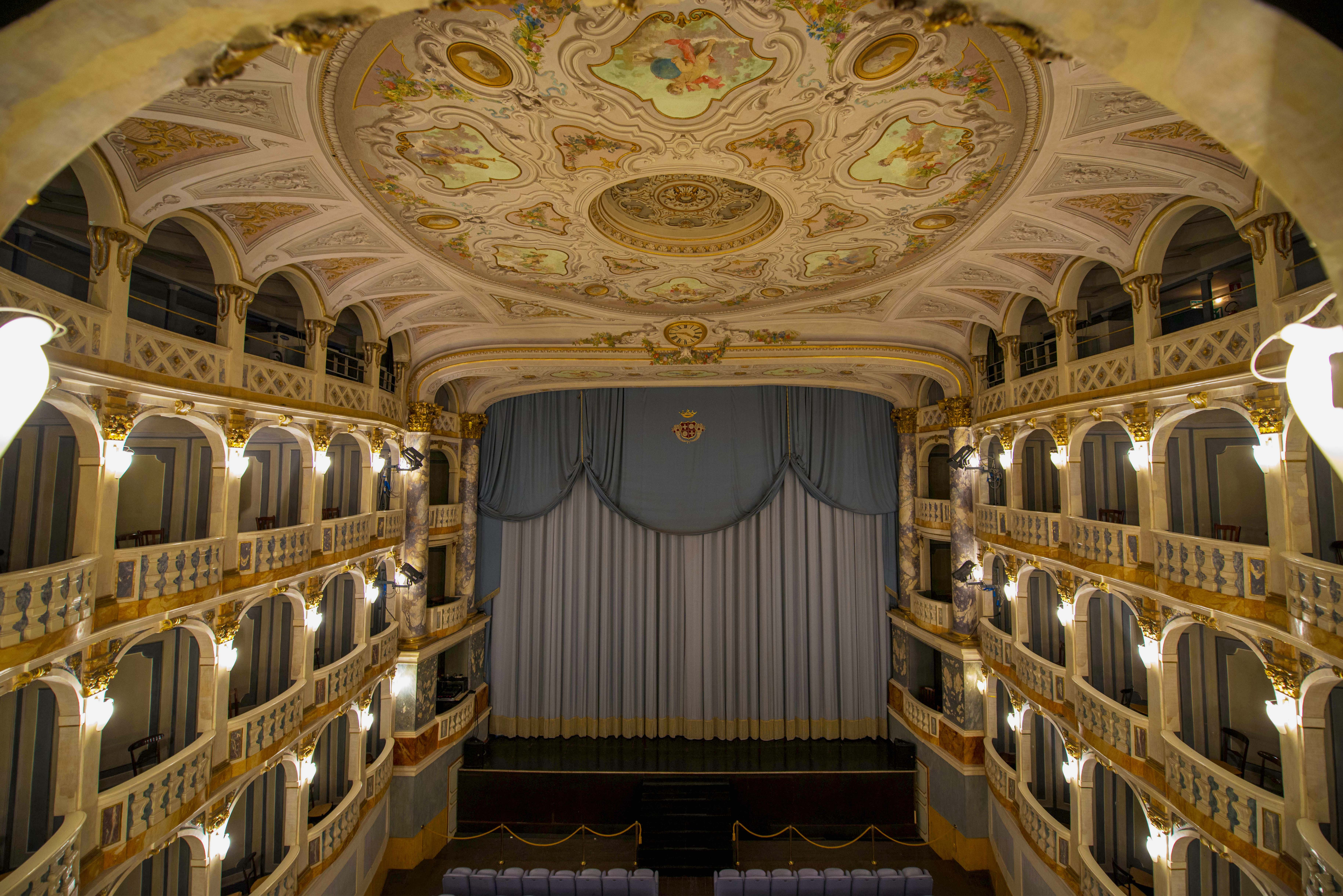
- Interactive map of the Teatro Lauro Rossi area

General information
- Location: Piazza della Libertà 21, 62100 Macerata, MC, Italy
- Coordinates: 43°18′01″N 13°27′12″E
- Opened: 1774

Website
- Official website

UNESCO World Heritage Site
- Official name: Teatro Lauro Rossi
- Part of: The system of Italian-style condominio theatres of the 18th and 19th centuries in Central Italy
- Criteria: Cultural: iii
- Reference: 1762
- Inscription: 2026 (48th Session)

Teatro Lauro Rossi is a theatre and opera house in Macerata, Italy, inaugurated in 1774 with Pasquale Anfossi's setting of Metastasio's libretto L'Olimpiade. It was renamed in honour of local composer Lauro Rossi in 1884, the year before the composer's death. The Teatro Lauro Rossi is now one of the venues employed by Sferisterio – Macerata Opera Festival.

In July 2026, the condominio theatres of the 18th and 19th centuries in Central Italy (including Teatro Lauro Rossi) were designated by UNESCO as a World Heritage Site.
