= Santi Giovanni Battista e Giovanni Evangelista, Macerata =

Church in Macerata, Marche, Italy

Coordinates: 43°17′56″N 13°27′03″E

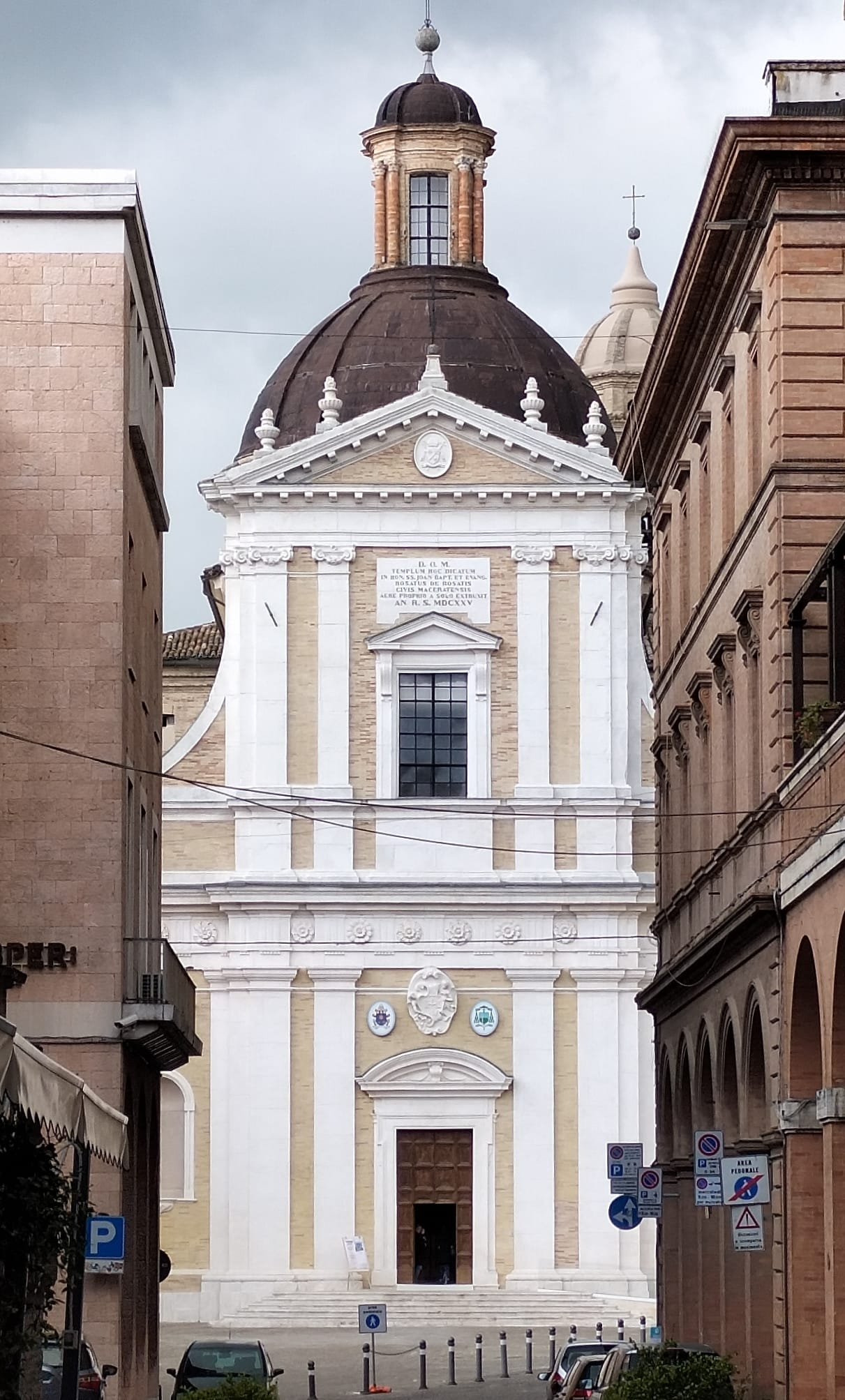
Santi Giovanni Battista e Giovanni Evangelista

Santi Giovanni Battista e Giovanni Evangelista, also called simply San Giovanni, is a Baroque-style, Roman Catholic church located on Via Giovanni Maria Crescimbeni #6, facing Piazza Vittorio Veneto, in the town of Macerata, region of Marche, Italy.

== History ==
The church was commissioned in the mid-16th century by the Jesuit order and expanded over the decades by the architect Giovanni Tristano. By 1580, further enlargement planned by the architect Giovanni De Rosis, begun in 1600. The construction was completed in 1625 by Rosato Rosati. A new bell tower was planned in 1737. A further consecration was held in 1721 with completion of the cupola in 1762.

The exterior is sober with Tuscan pilasters in the ground floor, a frieze with floral circles, and a second floor with Corinthian pilasters, upholding a triangular tympanum with decorative roofline corbels. The column elements are in white stone, that accentuates the brick background. The niches are empty.

The interior layout has a Latin cross plan, with three smaller chapels on each side. The nave and cupola was decorated by Pier Simone Fanelli, who painted saints and prophets in the spandrels. The main altar (1776) was built with polychrome marble by Cosimo Morelli.
