= Palazzo Buonaccorsi =

Coordinates: 43°18′02.66″N 13°27′19.26″E

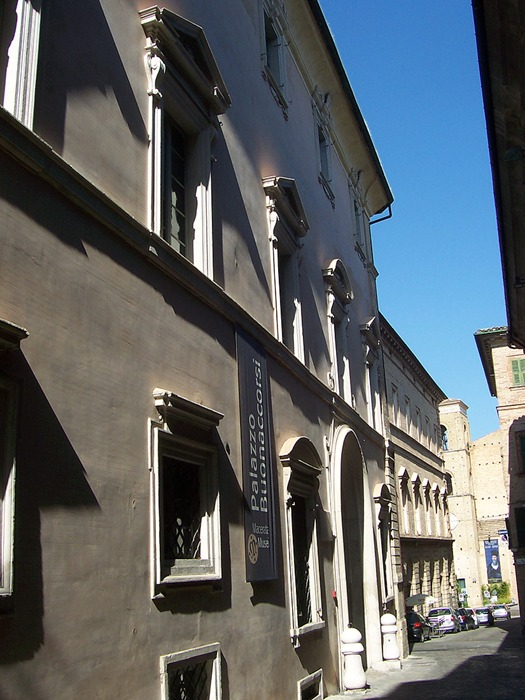
Facade

The Palazzo Buonaccorsi is an 18th-century aristocratic palace, now the civic museum of the town, located on Via Don Minzoni 24 in the historic center of Macerata, region of Marche, Italy.

== Description ==
The palace was erected on a site with some houses just inside the former medieval city walls. The Buonaccorsi family, led by Simone the Elder had risen to prominence by the mid-17th century; Simone's brother Buonaccorso (1620-1678) had become a cardinal. Simone endeavored to build a palace here, commensurate with the family's rising status. After the Simone's death in 1708, his son Raimondo continued the project, aided by his brother Filippo, Abbot of San Quirico, and employing the designs of the architects Giovanni Battista Contini and Ludovico Gregorini. The palace encompassed the former Palazzo Centini and other houses at the site. Raimondo's son, also called Simone (1708-1776) would also become a cardinal. After the death of Raimondi in 1746, the family was elevated in to the Roman Patriciate by Pope Benedict XIV, leading the family to abandon Macerata for Rome. The Buonaccorsi family returned in 1853 under Conte Flavio, and began needed refurbishments.

Raimondo and Simone were mainly responsible for patronizing the construction of the palace, and the decoration of the piano nobile. Such decoration began in 1707 with paintings by Carlo Antonio Rambaldi, and quadratura by Antonio Dardani. Abbot Filippo is said to have been instrumental in deciding on the choice of the subjects and iconography for painting, including the ceiling depicting the Marriage of Ariadne and Bacchus (by Michelangelo Ricciolini and his son Niccolo) with vaults the hall decorated with a dozen rococo canvas paintings (1710-1715) on episodes from the Aeneid, painted by among the most prominent Italian artists of the time.

Today the palace accommodates the "Musei Civici di Palazzo Buonaccorsi" including a pinacoteca (painting gallery spanning works from the medieval period to modern times, and houses a carriage museum (Museo della Carrozza), as well as a library (biblioteca "Amedeo Ricci").

== Overview of art collections ==
The palace's main floor is known for the Sala dell'Eneide (Hall of the Aeneid); the panels display events from Virgil's epic, although one canvas above the door elaborates on the supremacy of Christian to Pagan religion. The canvases depict:

Image	Name	Painter
	Venus appears to Aeneas and Anchises	Antonio Balestra
	Aeneas, Ascanius, Anchises, and Creusa flee from Troy	Giovanni Giorgi
	Aeneas and Ascanius first encounter Dido	Giovanni Gioseffo dal Sole
	Aeneas tells Dido about the fall of Troy	Nicolò Bambini
	Aeneas and Dido in the cave	Francesco Solimena
	Mercury reminds Aeneas of his destiny	Marcantonio Franceschini
	Death of Dido	Gregorio Lazzarini
	Aeneas snaps the golden bough	Giuseppe Gambarini
	The God Tiber	Giacomo del Po
	Venus at the furnace of Vulcan	Luigi Garzi
	Venus giving arms to Aeneas	Paolo de Matteis
	Duel between Aeneas and Mezentius	Gregorio Lazzarini

The museum galleries have a broad representation of art from the past centuries, including the following painters: Nicolò Bambini, Luigi Bartolini, Marco Benefial, Christian Berentz, Danilo Bergamo, Andrea Boscoli, Francesco Boniforti (Copy of a work by Zuccari), Elia Bonci, Antonio Bonfigli, Domenico Bruschi, Corrado Cagli, Michelangelo Conte, Domenico Cantatore, Ugo Capocchini, Bice Castelnuovo, Rosa Catella, Domenico Corvi, Giacomo Francesco Cipper, Luigi Dania, Marco Davanzo, Giacomo Del Po, Gildo Di Segni, Carlo Dolci, Bernardi Eva Doyen, Giuseppe Fammilume, Pier Simone Fanelli, Giuseppe Ludovico Felici, Tonino Ferraioli, Carlo Firmani, Alessandro Gallucci, Gaspare Gasparrini, Pier Leone Ghezzi, Vitali Argenide Gigli, Giovanni Giorgi, Corrado Giaquinto, Giovanni di Corraduccio, Giuseppe Innocenzi, Giovanni Korompay, Giovanni Andrea Lazzarini, Johannes Lingelbach, Carlo Magini, Cortesi Giuseppe Mancini, Francesco Mancini, Giuseppe Mainini, Maratta, Giorgio Massetani, Giuseppe Mazzolini, Vincenzo Monti, Anthonis Mor, Morelli, Spada G Nardi, Elena Nobili, Orazio Orazi, Paolo Pace, Giorgio Secondo Paletti, Claudia Panciera, Corrado Pellini, Cesare Peruzzi, Mario Pierluigi, Antonio Pietroni, Francesco Podesti, Scipione Pulzone, Maria Randone, Filippo Reggiani, Gemma Rocca, Michele Rocca, Philipp Peter Roos, Linuccia Saba, Piero Sadun, Joachim von Sandrart, Santi di Tito, Sassoferrato, Antonio Scordia, Girolamo Siciolante da Sermoneta, Laura Spadoni, Luigi Spazzapan, Ilario Spolverini, Luigi Svecchi, Tamburini, Michele Talamè, Bruno Tano, Valeriano Trubbiani, Giulio Turcato, Emilio Vedova, Claude Joseph Vernet, and Giuseppe Zigaina.

Displayed in its 19th century galleries, the museum acquired directly from the artists, Gualtiero Baynes (Macerata 1856 - Florence 1938) and Giuseppe Bonolis, a collection of works.
