= Macerata Opera =

Government-run operatic body in Marche, Italy

The Macerata Opera is the name given to the coordinating bodies of the provincial and local government in Macerata, the provincial capital of the Marche region of Italy, which puts on performances of three or four operas each July and August under the name Macerata Opera Festival. From 1992 the Opera Association was founded by the municipality and the Province Association of Macerata to oversee the operations of the Festival. In addition to the main summer activities, the Association organizes many other musical events, ranging from the New Music Festival to the performances of baroque music in a number of historical sites and buildings. The Association also organizes international conferences.

== Overview ==
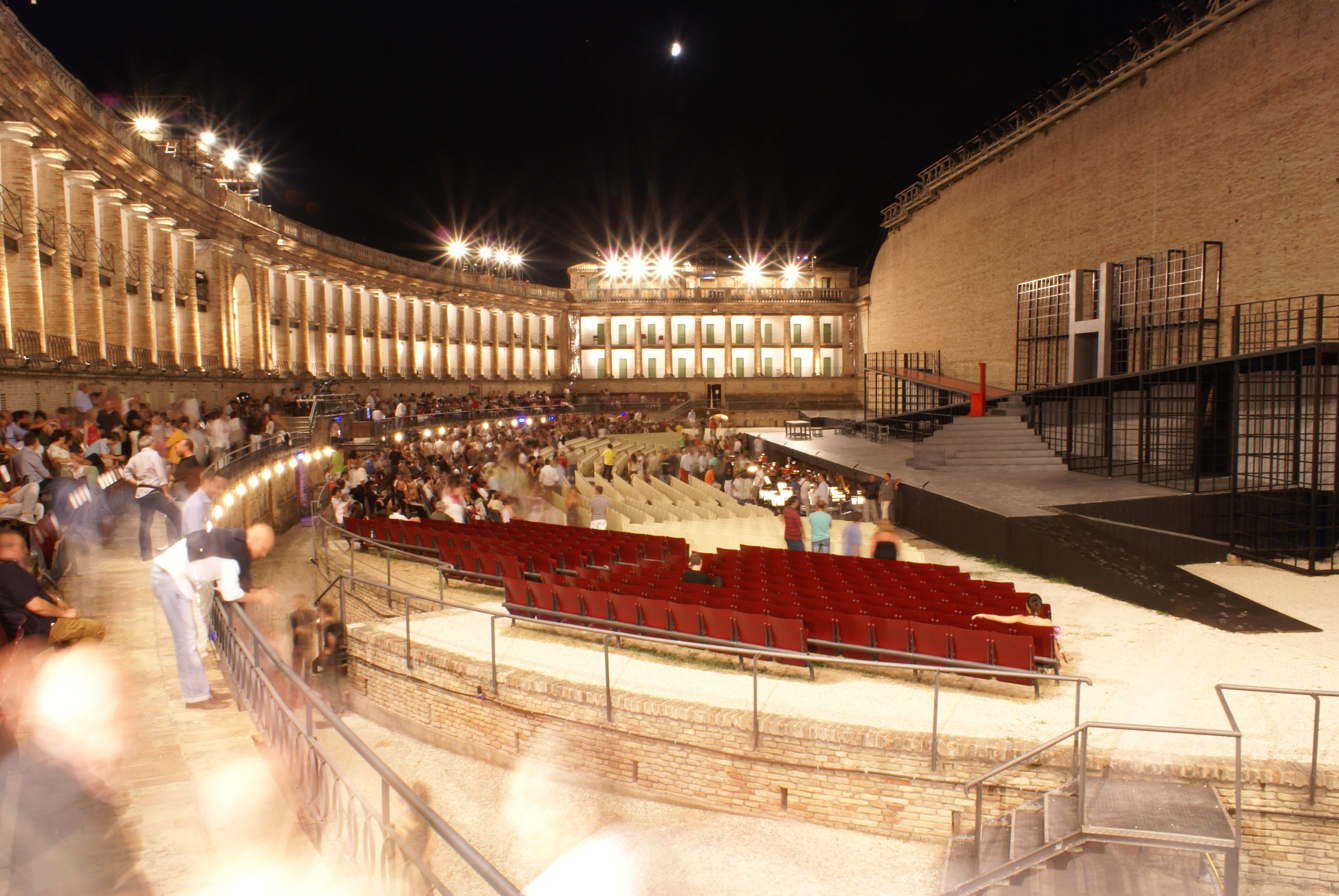
Sferisterio open-air theatre

While the Macerata Opera has organized the Macerata Opera Festival as a summer opera festival, it actually began in 1921 with a performance of Verdi's Aida in the 3,000 seat (plus 6,000 standing places) Arena Sferisterio, a huge neoclassical arena erected in the 1820s as a stadium for a form of handball called pallone al bracciale, a sort of game with ball and bangle. After a disastrous second year due to the performance of La Gioconda being rained out, (and except for a popular concert by Beniamino Gigli in 1929), the Festival did not begin again until 1967. The present layout of the arena allows for the seating of 3,500 to 4,500 people depending upon the specific sets.

By the late 1960s, the Festival was re-established, presenting mainly popular 19th and early 20th Century Italian opera, most of which were Macerata premieres. Within ten years, the repertory was gradually broadened to include more modern and foreign works but, for financial reasons, the emphasis was on the bigger crowd-pleasers with as many big name international opera singers as possible. In addition, many Regietheater-style productions were to be found such as film director Ken Russell's Madama Butterfly set in a brothel and a Franco Zeffirelli Carmen set in a motor cycle gang populated New York city.

With the decline in international singer participation as the 1990s progressed, the last decade has seen a return to popular Italian operas given spectacular productions.

From 2003 to 2005, the soprano Katia Ricciarelli was Artistic Director. But 2006 saw changes at the Sferisterio with the artistic direction being taken over by Pier Luigi Pizzi and a summer festival concept created. A common theme evolved in the selection of operas to be performed and, at the same time, the reconstruction of the stage was undertaken. The 2006 season acknowledged the 250th anniversary of Mozart's birth, with a production of The Magic Flute. Performances were moved to 9pm to take to allow the audience to enjoy the sunset. Seminars, discussions, and readings of literary works were added.

Venues include Teatro Lauro Rossi.

== See also ==
- List of opera festivals
