= Santa Maria della Porta, Macerata =

Church building in Macerata, Italy

Coordinates: 43°17′58″N 13°27′13″E

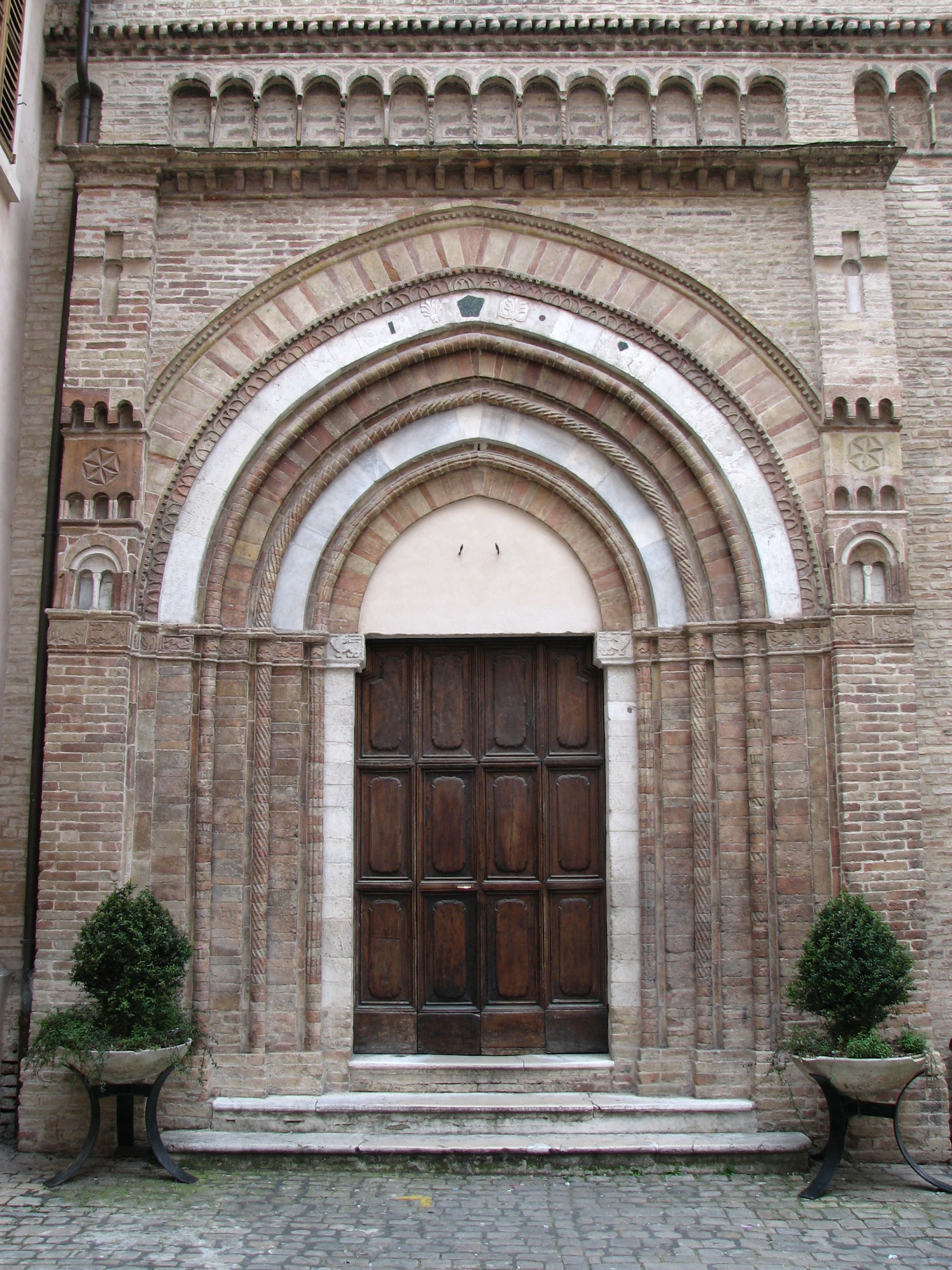
Portal of the Church of Santa Maria della Porta in Macerata, Italy, XIII c.

Santa Maria della Porta is a Romanesque and Gothic-style, Roman Catholic church located between Via Padre Matteo Ricci and Via Santa Maria della Porta, with one façade on La Scaletta, a pedestrian staircase leading up to Piazza della Liberta, in central Macerata, region of Marche, Italy.

== History ==
This brick church is oriented with apse in the east, and located in an awkward hillside. A church at the site was likely in place by the 10th century. The portal has receding round arches within an acute angle frame. A second portal opens to Via Santa Maria. Below the church is a crypt that housed a Confraternity of Flagellants, whose symbol is sculpted in the ceiling.

The crypt was initially dedicated to St Mary of the Assumption. The main altarpiece depicts an Assumption of the Virgin by Domenico Corvi.
