= Santo Stefano, Macerata =

Church in Macerata, Italy

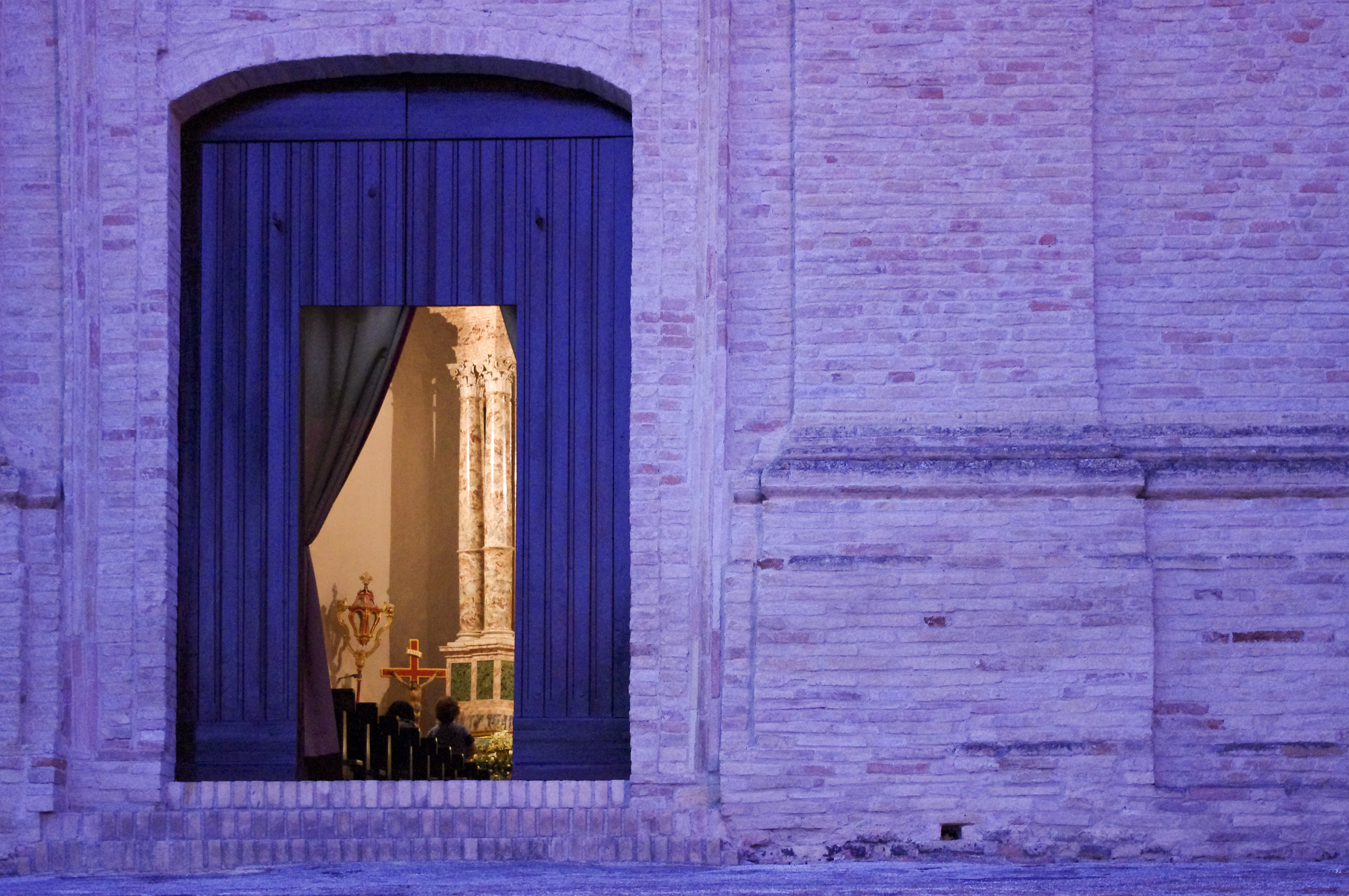
Macerate – Chiesa di Santo Stefa

Santo Stefano, also called the Chiesa dei Cappuccini Vecchi, is a Renaissance-style, Roman Catholic church located on Via Fonte Maggiore, about a mile north of the town Macerata, region of Marche, Italy.

== History ==
The Capuchin order came to Macerata in 1544, and as was common for Franciscan order, established itself outside the city walls in this rural location. In 1603, however, they relocated into town, and the church became parish church of the Contrada Santo Stefano. Soon thereafter, the present church was erected.

The façade is serene and sober with monumental Doric pilasters supporting an unadorned triangular tympanum. The central portal has a rounded pediment. This church has a Latin cross layout with three chapels on each side. The main altarpiece is a Death of St Joseph attributed to the studio of Carlo Maratta. The interior also has a fresco image of a Madonna della Fede derived from a nearby chapel.
