= Ferdinando Cicconi =

Italian painter (1831–1886)

Ferdinando Cicconi (1831 – 1886) was an Italian painter, active in a Romantic style.

== Biography ==
Ferdinando was born in Colli del Tronto, but studied in Rome at the Academy of St Luke under the direction of Tommaso Minardi. Returning to his native region, he decorated the anteroom of the Teatro Ventidio Basso of Ascoli Piceno and the Teatro of San Elpidio a Mare. He painted some patriotic canvases depicting a Patriotic Demonstration at the Piazza del Popolo in Rome and the Entry of the Piedmontese Army through the Porta Maggiore both displayed in the Pinacoteca civica of the commune of Colli del Tronto.

His colorful small villa, located between Colli del Tronto and Ascoli Piceno, has a colorful facade, to which he contributed the design and decoration. On the facade are busts of Leonardo da Vinci, Michelangelo and Raphael. Ciccone was unable to complete the interior fresco decoration.
