= Marco Davanzo =

Italian painter (1872–1955)

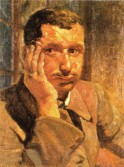
Davanzo self-portrait (c. 1910)

Marco Davanzo (25 July 1872 – 2 July 1955) was an Italian painter, known for his luminous landscapes depicting the Carnic Alps.

== Biography ==
Davanzo was born in Ampezzo, from a wealthy family of traders. At young age he showed talent for painting and was noted by Camillo Boito, an eminent architect and art critic. Boito convinced the family to send him to the Accademia di Belle Arti di Venezia, where he studied under Ettore Tito and Antonio Dal Zòtto.

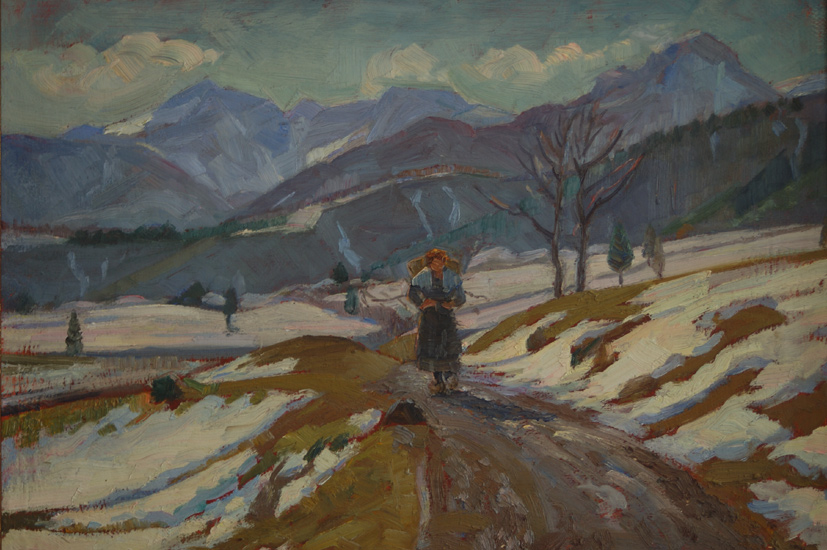
Paesaggio carnico (Carnic landscape)

Upon completing his military service in Rome in 1898, Davanzo exhibited successfully in Turin's Nazionale. This exploit made him know thorough Europe, and he was subsequently invited to display in London (1903), at the Venice Biennale (1903), at the Salon d'Automne in Paris (1904) and at the International Exposition in Munich (1912).

After the Battle of Caporetto, he and his family had to flee from his hometown, finding refuge in Marche region. Between the two World Wars Davanzo developed a looser, chromatically brighter style.

In 1935 Davanzo was invited to another Biennale in 1935; in his later years he became more and more secluded, moving near the Alps in Ampezzo that featured in so many of his landscapes. He kept painting until his death in 1955.

== Style and works ==
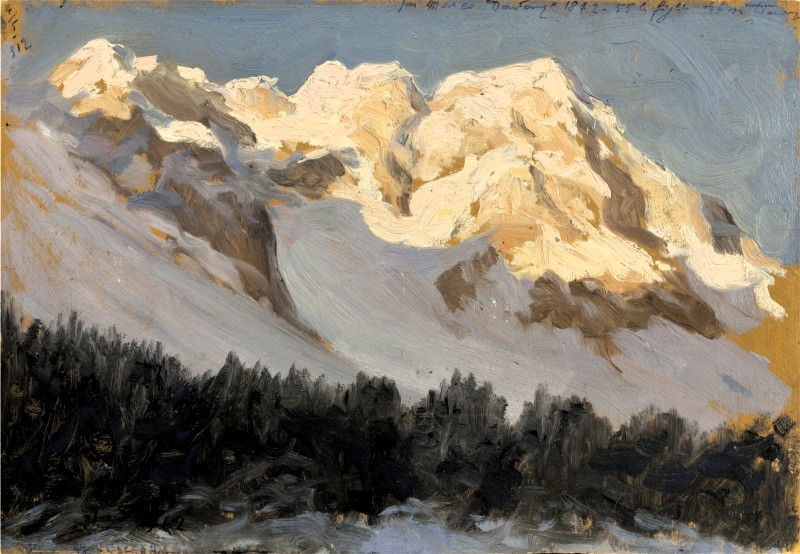
Montagne innevate (Snowy mountains)

Davanzo was a realist painter. Characteristic of his work are crystalline atmospheres, verismo in depicting the agrarian world and a refractive synthesis between light and color. In his portraits, Davanzo sought to blend plastic rendition, painterly strokes and psychological scrutiny of the subject.
