= Ireneo Aleandri =

Italian architect of the Neoclassic period

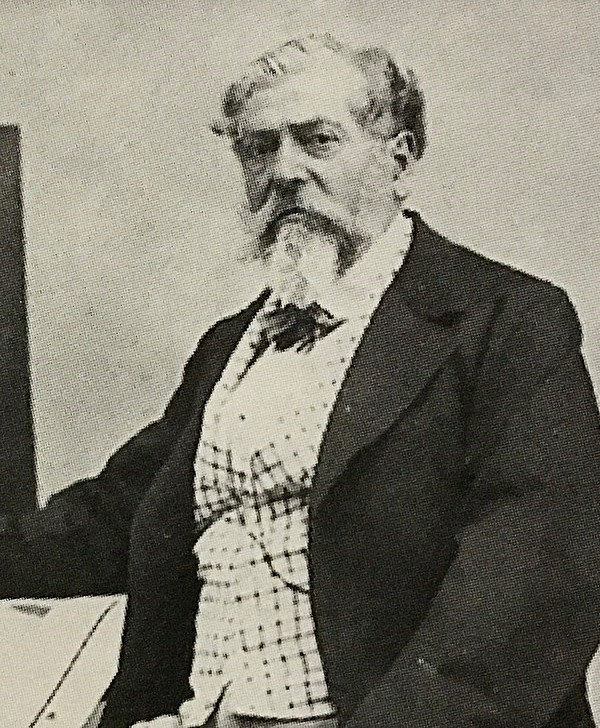
Ireneo Aleandri

Ireneo Aleandri (1795–1885) was an Italian architect of the Neoclassic period.

He was born in San Severino Marche, but studied at the Accademia di San Luca in Rome. In his youth, he completed a number of restorations and buildings in his native town, including a Restoration of the Porta di San Lorenzo (1820), the Teatro Feronia (1823), and the church of San Paolo (1828), the church of San Michele (1830), and the Torre dell’Orologio in the Piazza del Popolo (1832).

His masterpiece is the Sferisterio di Macerata (completed in 1829). He moved to Spoleto where he designed the Teatro Nuovo (1853). He also designed the Teatro Ventidio Basso di Ascoli Piceno (1839) and the viaduct of Ariccia.
