= Macerata =

- Comune
- Comune di Macerata
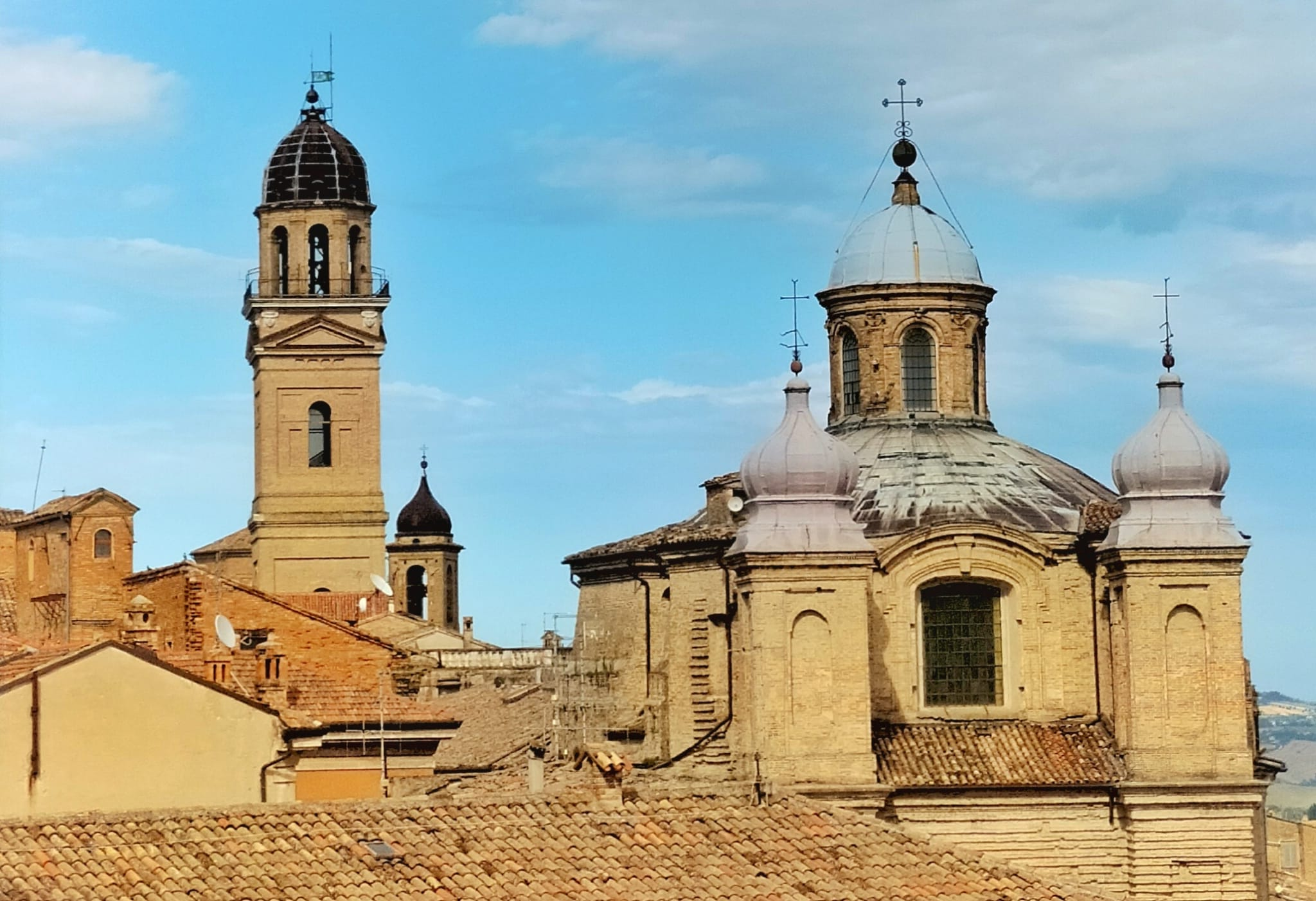

- Coat of arms

- Location of Macerata within its province

- Location within Italy Location within Marche
- Coordinates: 43°18′01″N 13°27′12″E
- Country: Italy
- Region: Marche
- Province: Macerata (MC)
- Frazioni: Cimarella, Sforzacosta, Santa Maria del Monte, Piediripa, Villa Potenza, Madonna del Monte, Montanello, Montevinci, Santo Stefano, Consalvi, Valle, Valteia

Government
  - Mayor: Sandro Parcaroli (since September 2020)

Area
  - Total: 92.73 km^{2} (35.80 sq mi)
- Elevation: 315 m (1,033 ft)

Population (31 December 2017)
  - Total: 41,564
  - Density: 448.2/km^{2} (1,161/sq mi)
- Demonym: Maceratesi
- Time zone: UTC+1 (CET)
  - Summer (DST): UTC+2 (CEST)
- Postal code: 62100
- Dialing code: 0733
- ISTAT code: 043023
- Patron saint: Julian the Hospitaller
- Saint day: 31 August
- Website: Official website

Macerata (Italian pronunciation: [matʃeˈraːta]) is a city and comune in central Italy, the county seat of the province of Macerata in the Marche region. It has a population of about 41,564.

It is home to the University of Macerata (founded in 1290), making it one of Europe's oldest universities, specializing in humanities and social sciences, and located in a historic center with medieval walls.

One of the city's best-known landmarks is the Sferisterio, a large neoclassical open-air arena built in the 19th century, which later became a major venue for summer performances, including opera.

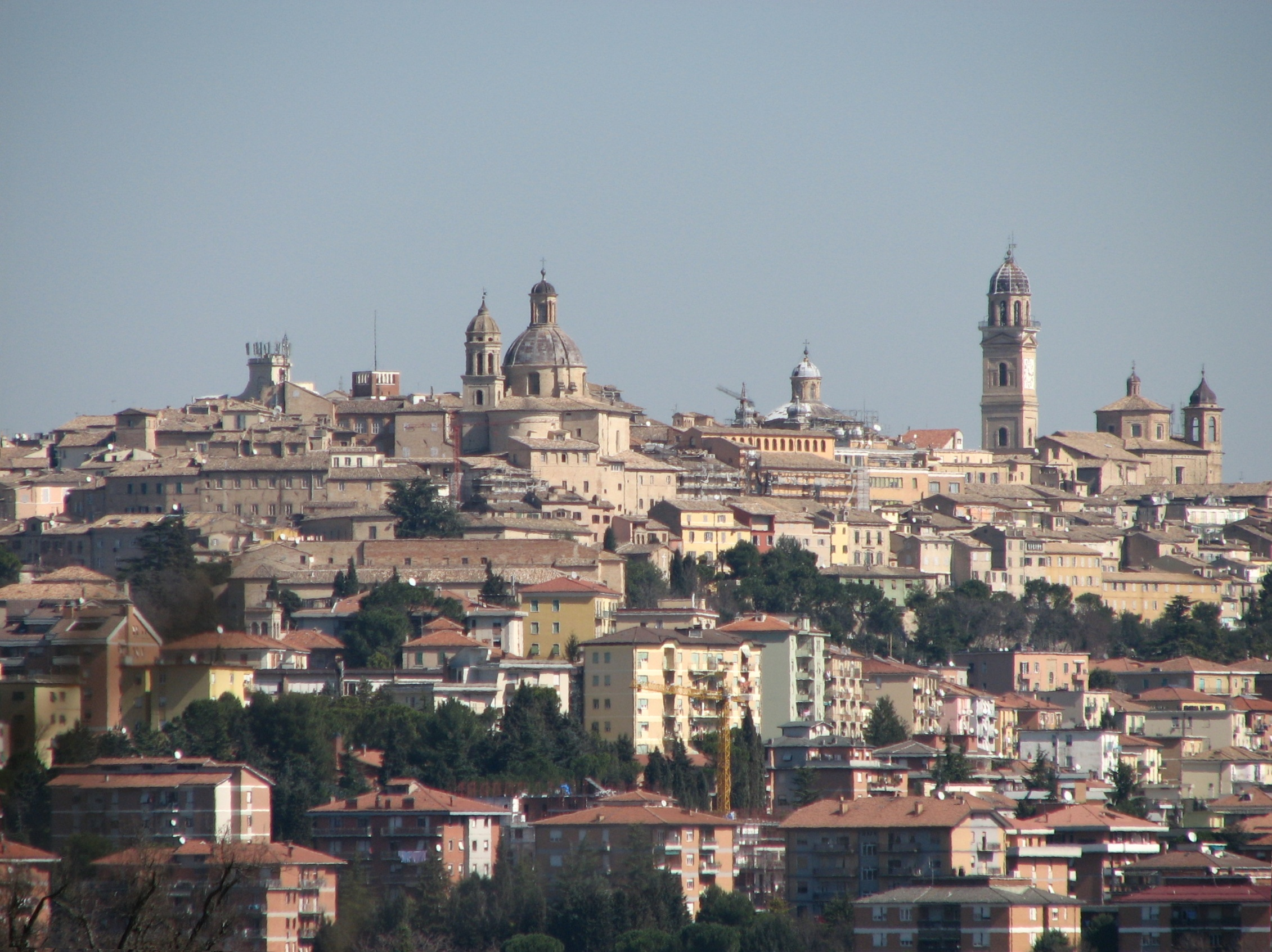
Panoramic view of Macerata

== History ==
The historical city centre is on a hill between the Chienti and Potenza rivers. It first consisted of the Picenes city named Ricina (Helvia Recina), then, after its Romanization, Recina and Helvia Recina. After the destruction of Helvia Recina by the barbarians, the inhabitants took shelter in the hills and eventually began to rebuild the city, first on the top of the hills, before descending again later and expanding. The newly rebuilt town was Macerata. It became a municipality (or comune in Italian) in August 1138.

In 1320, Pope John XXII transferred the episcopal see to Macerata, a change that strengthened the city's institutional status within the Papal States and contributed to its subsequent demographic and political growth.

During the sixteenth century the city underwent significant urban and architectural development, including major works to its defensive system and the remodelling of key civic spaces. Studies on Macerata's urban walls describe important early-modern interventions associated with bastioned fortifications and the work of Cristoforo Resse da Imola. The Loggia dei Mercanti (1504–1505), attributed to Cassiano da Fabriano (with Matteo Sabatini), is among the best-documented civic monuments from this period.

In the wider cultural ferment of late Renaissance Italy, on 2 July 1574 the scholar Gerolamo Zoppio—professor at the University of Macerata—founded the Accademia dei Catenati, which became a longstanding cultural institution in the city.

From the late sixteenth century, administrative centralisation driven from Rome also affected the Papal State's provincial governance; a frequently cited reference point in this context is Clement VIII's bull De Bono Regimine (1592).

During the French Revolutionary and Napoleonic period, the Marche experienced repeated episodes of mobilisation and conflict. In 1799 Macerata was involved in the anti-French “insorgenze”; after fighting, French troops broke into the city and it was subjected to looting (reported for early July 1799).

In the nineteenth century, Macerata took part in the Risorgimento. Archival accounts record Giuseppe Garibaldi's presence in the city from 1 January 1849 and his election during that period. In October 1860 Victor Emmanuel II passed through Macerata, an event noted in contemporary political biographies and local historical reconstruction. In the plebiscites of November 1860, the Marche voted for annexation to the Kingdom of Sardinia (and subsequently the Kingdom of Italy).

=== 20th century ===
The comune of Macerata was the location of an internment camp for Jews and refugees, and a prisoner-of-war camp (PG53, at Sforzacosta) during World War II.

In the Second World War, partisan formations operated in the province; Macerata was liberated on 30 June 1944, an episode associated with the Gruppo Bande Nicolò led by Augusto Pantanetti in local and national resistance documentation.

== Geography ==
Macerata lies on a hill at about 314 metres above sea level, between the Potenza valley and the Chienti valley, and about 21 km inland from the Adriatic coast.

== Climate ==
The city's climate reflects its inland hilly setting, with Mediterranean influences from the nearby sea and more continental features linked to elevation and distance from the coast. Winters are generally mild for central Italy, although cooler spells can occur; summers are typically warm and largely sunny. At times, a south-westerly wind locally associated with the libeccio (also known regionally as garbino) can bring noticeably warmer conditions, including outside the summer season.

Precipitation in the Marche region commonly varies across the territory; one regional overview reports annual totals typically between about 600 and 1,000 mm, with Macerata around 769 mm per year (as a reference value). Heatwaves can bring very high temperatures in summer; during early August 2017, maximum temperatures exceeded 40 °C in parts of the Marche.

== Main sights ==
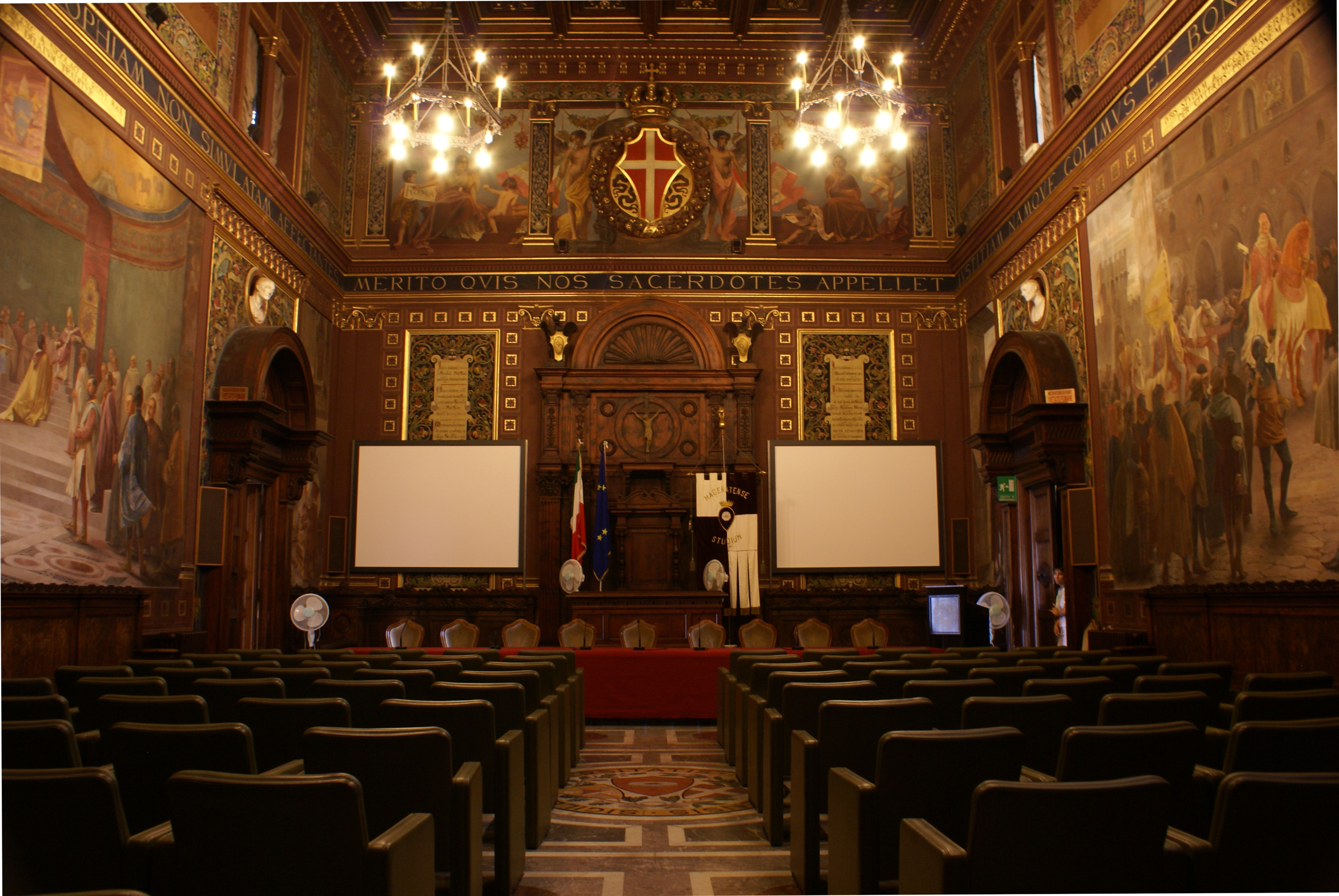
The great hall of the University of Macerata.

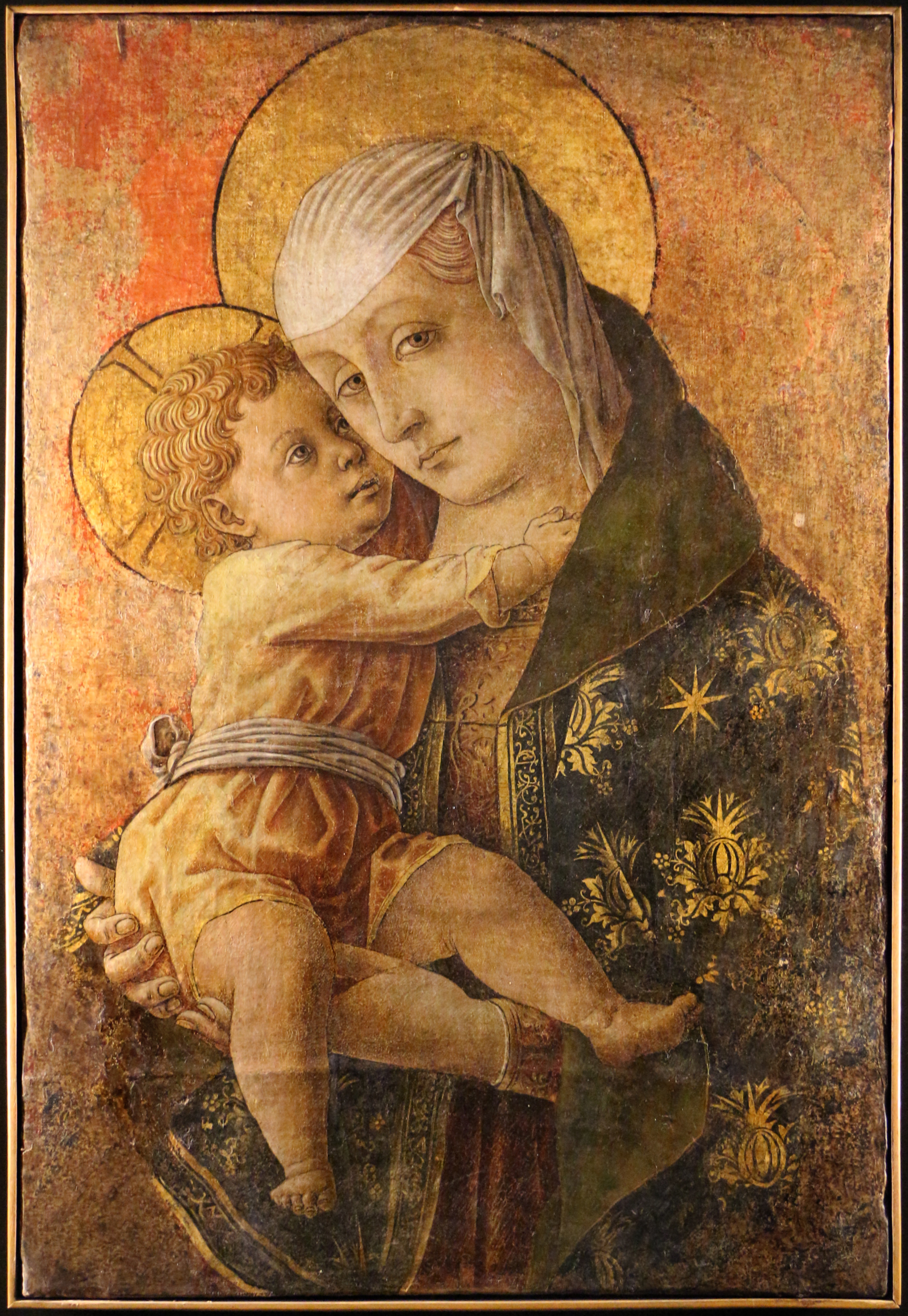
Madonna with Child by Carlo Crivelli (1470), Pinacoteca di Macerata

In the central Piazza, della Libertà is the Loggia dei Mercanti with two-tier arcades dating from the Renaissance. There are a number of striking palazzi, mostly along Corso Matteotti, including Palazzo dei Diamanti. Next to the Loggia dei Mercanti, Corso della Repubblica leads to Piazza Vittorio Veneto where, in the Palazzo Ricci, houses the city's modern art gallery. The nearby Palazzo Buonaccorsi houses the main civic art museum, as well as a Carriage Museum. The palace was built in 1700–1720 for Count Raimondo Buonaccorsi and his son Cardinal Simone Buonaccorsi using designs by Giovanni Battista Contini. The piano nobile is known for the Sala dell'Eneide (Hall of the Aeneid), decorated with frescoes depicting episodes of the Aeneid depicted by Rambaldi, Dardani, Solimena, and canvases by Garzi and Giovanni Gioseffo dal Sole. Among the museum's masterpieces is the Renaissance work of the Madonna and Child by Carlo Crivelli.

The Biblioteca Comunale Mozzi Borgetti, the main civic library of Macerata, founded in the 18th century, is housed in the former Jesuit seminary, located on Piazza Vittorio Veneto.

The University of Macerata was founded in 1290 and has about 13,000 students; Macerata also has an art school, two publishing houses (Liberilibri and Quodlibet), jazz clubs and the like.

Just north of the town, at the Villa Potenza, lie the remains of ancient Helvia Recina, a Roman settlement destroyed by the Visigoths.

== Monuments and places of interest ==
=== Religious architecture ===
- Cathedral of San Giovanni. Dedicated to Saints John the Baptist and John the Evangelist, designed by Rosato Rosati, it was built in 1600 at the behest of the Jesuits. It was consecrated in 1721. Notable features include its imposing dome; the interior has a single nave with six side chapels. Reopened and reconsecrated in December 2022, it is the cathedral of the Diocese of Macerata.
- Duomo of San Giuliano. Dedicated to the city's patron saint, it served as the cathedral of the diocese until 6 February 2023.
- Basilica of Santa Maria della Misericordia
- Church of San Filippo Neri
- Church of Santa Maria della Porta
- Church of Santa Maria delle Vergini
- Former church of San Paolo and former Barnabite convent.
- Church of San Liberato (or Santa Maria Incoronata), built in the 14th century around a frescoed shrine depicting San Liberato (Pietro da Macerata), later replaced around 1515–1520 by a Santa Maria Incoronata painted by Lorenzo di Giovanni de Carris and now almost completely repainted; the church, rebuilt from 1520, took its second name from this work. In the church there are other votive frescoes by Lorenzo di Giovanni, including a fragmentary Saint Francis on the counter-façade dated 1532 in the inscription, one with Saint Raphael the Archangel, Tobias and Saint Blaise, and another with a Crucifixion between Saints Nicholas of Bari, Julian and Mary Magdalene, probably all from the same period. Another Crucifixion between Saints Roch and Sebastian on the wall next to the fresco with Raphael and Tobias has been attributed to Giovenale da Narni and, more recently, to Lorenzo di Giovanni himself in the mid-1530s.
- Church of Santo Stefano, built by the Capuchins in 1544 and later rebuilt between 1665 and 1682, when it was decided to bring inside a much-venerated fresco of the Madonna and Child between Saints Julian and Roch by Lorenzo di Giovanni de Carris, made as an ex voto against pestilence, the French invasion and, reportedly, locusts; it had previously been placed in a roadside shrine. In the chapel of Santa Maria della Fede there are two canvases depicting Angels with the symbols of the Immaculate Conception, presumably painted to flank a Marian image (perhaps from Loreto), signed and dated 1604 by Marcello Gobbi, a pupil of Andrea Boscoli, and made for the Florentine Gino Capponi, then Treasurer of the Marca.
- Church of San Giorgio – one of the oldest in the city; documents date the building to 1268. In 1542 the municipality rebuilt the church, removing the front portico; later works completed in 1845 led to the current façade, designed by Agostino Benedettelli.
- Church of Santa Maria della Pace
- Church of San Michele Arcangelo
- Church of San Francesco
- Church of Santa Madre di Dio
- Church of the Sacred Heart
- Church of Santa Croce
- Former Capuchin church, now the chapel of the civil hospital, preserves on the high altar an altarpiece signed by Bernardino Nocchi and dated 1804 depicting the Immaculate Conception.
- Former convent of San Vincenzo with adjoining centrally planned church. The restored complex is now one of the sites of the Academy of Fine Arts of Macerata. The deconsecrated church has become the academy's main hall/auditorium.

=== Civil architecture ===
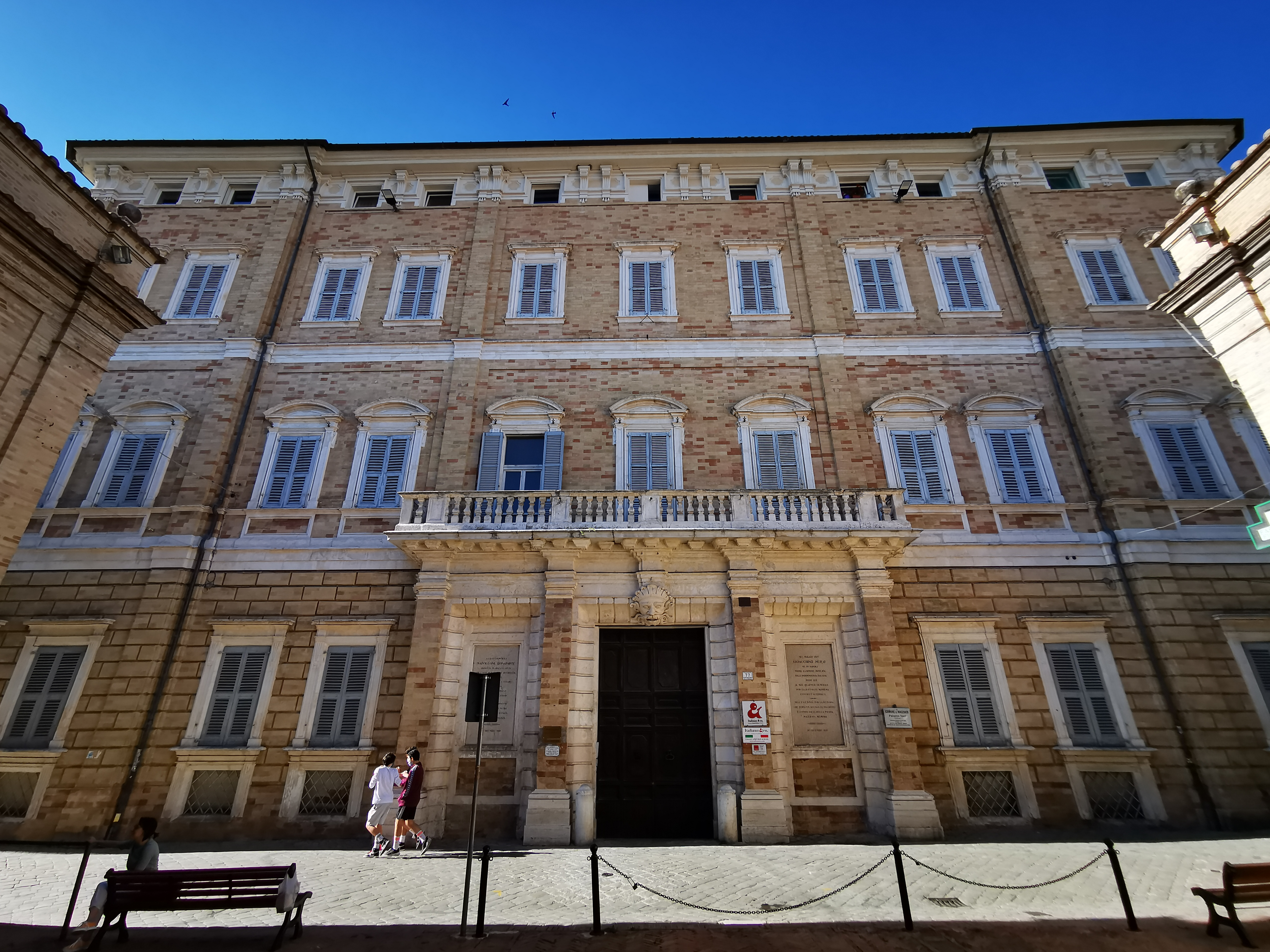
Palazzo Torri

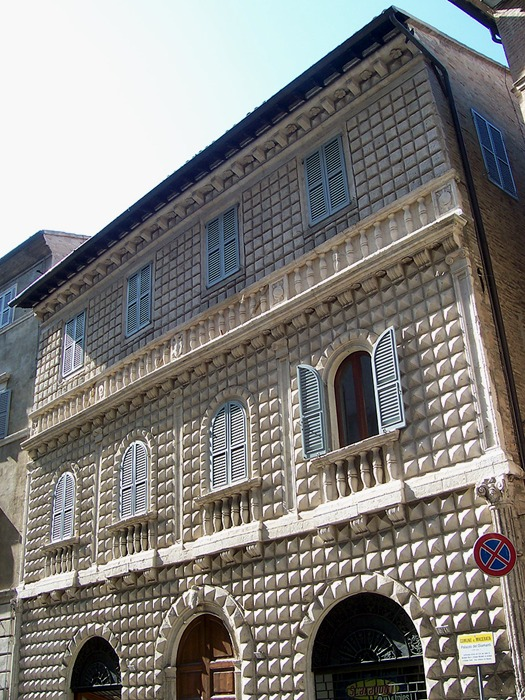
Palazzo of the Bank of Italy, formerly Palazzo Mozzi (Mozzi-Ferri), also known as the Palazzo dei Diamanti

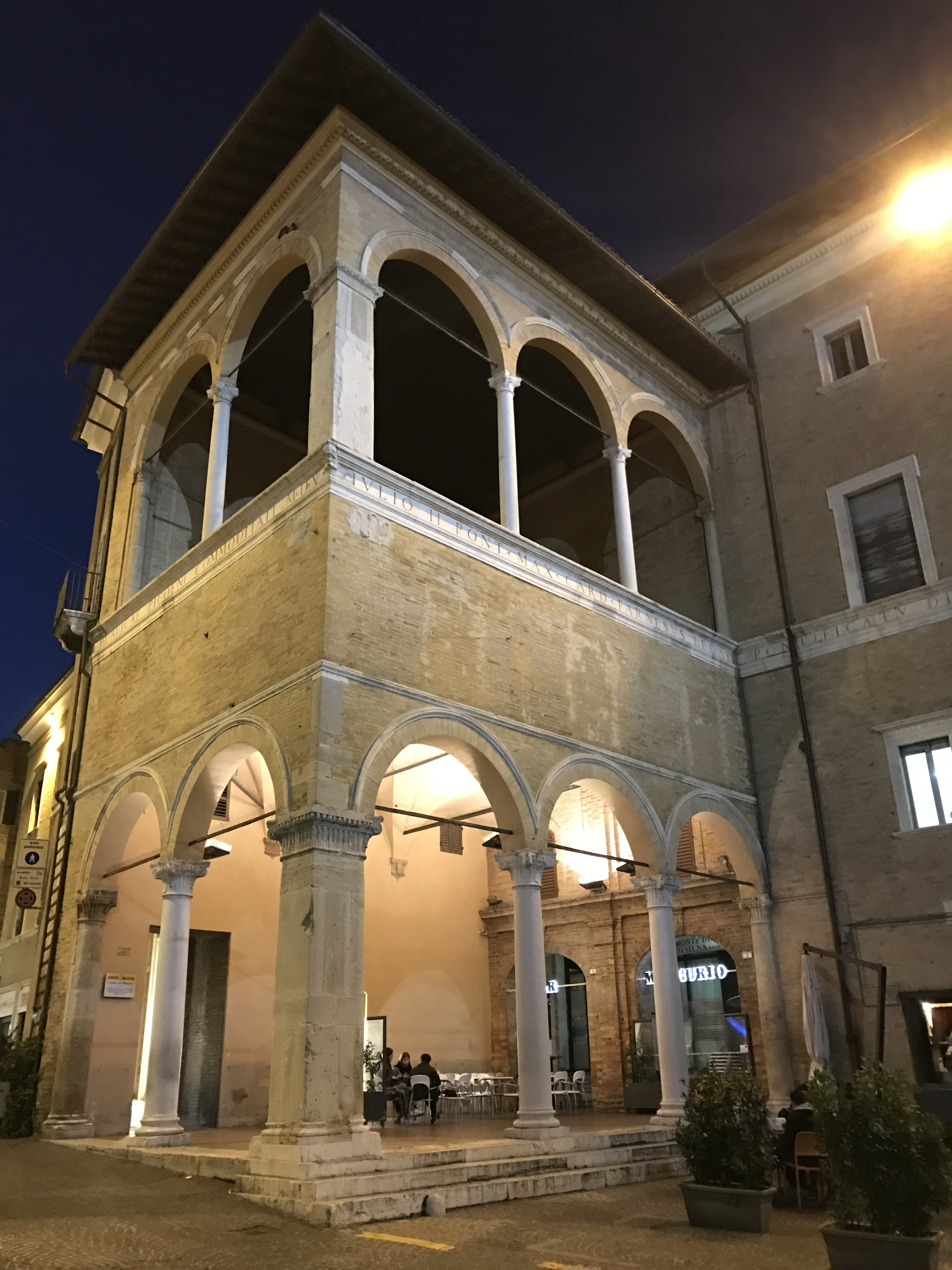
The Loggia dei Mercanti in Piazza della Libertà

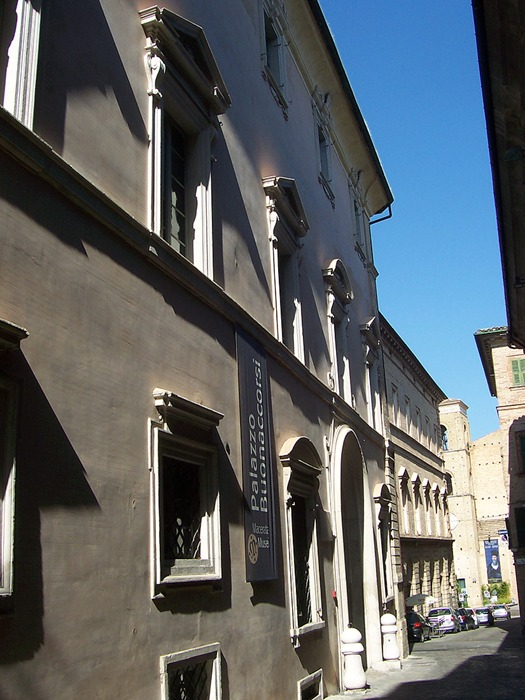
Palazzo Buonaccorsi, venue for many exhibitions

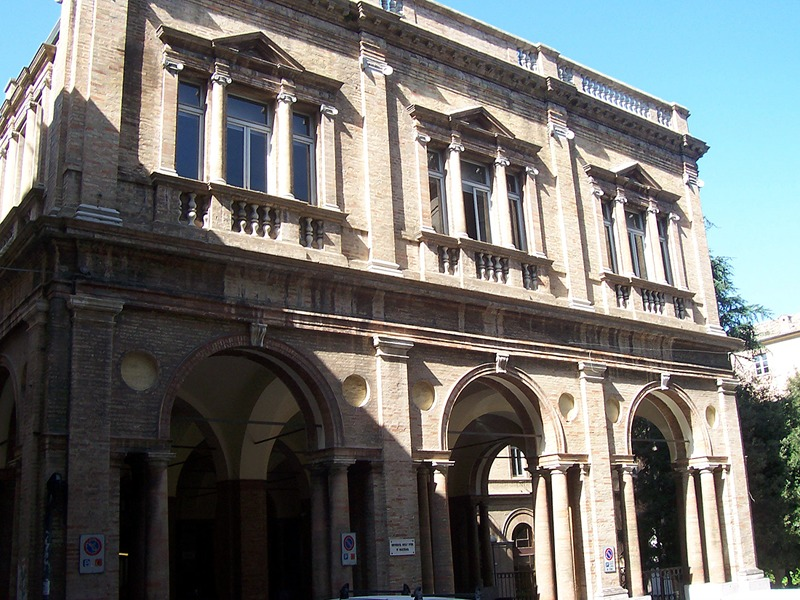
Loggia del grano

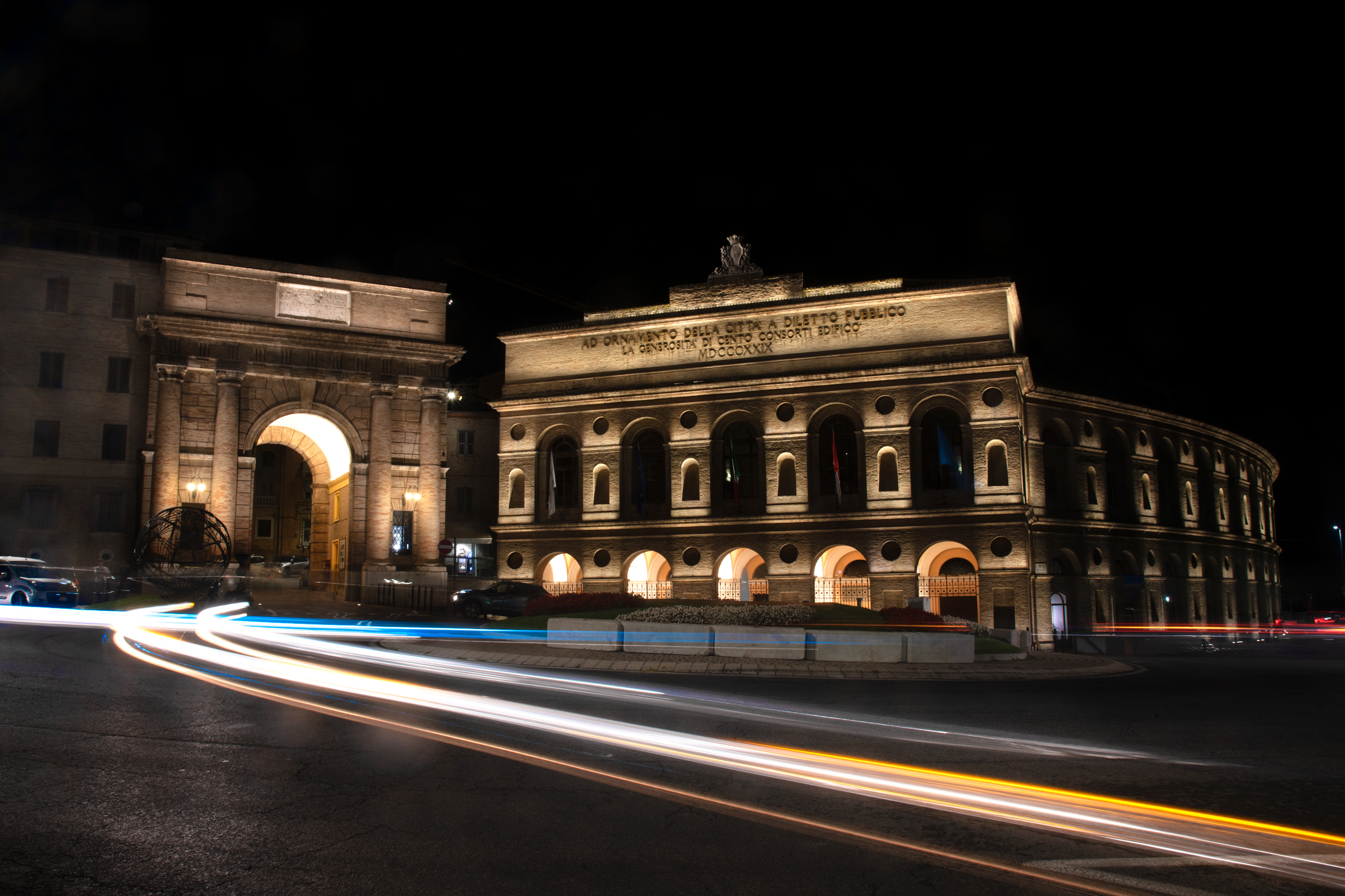
Arena Sferisterio

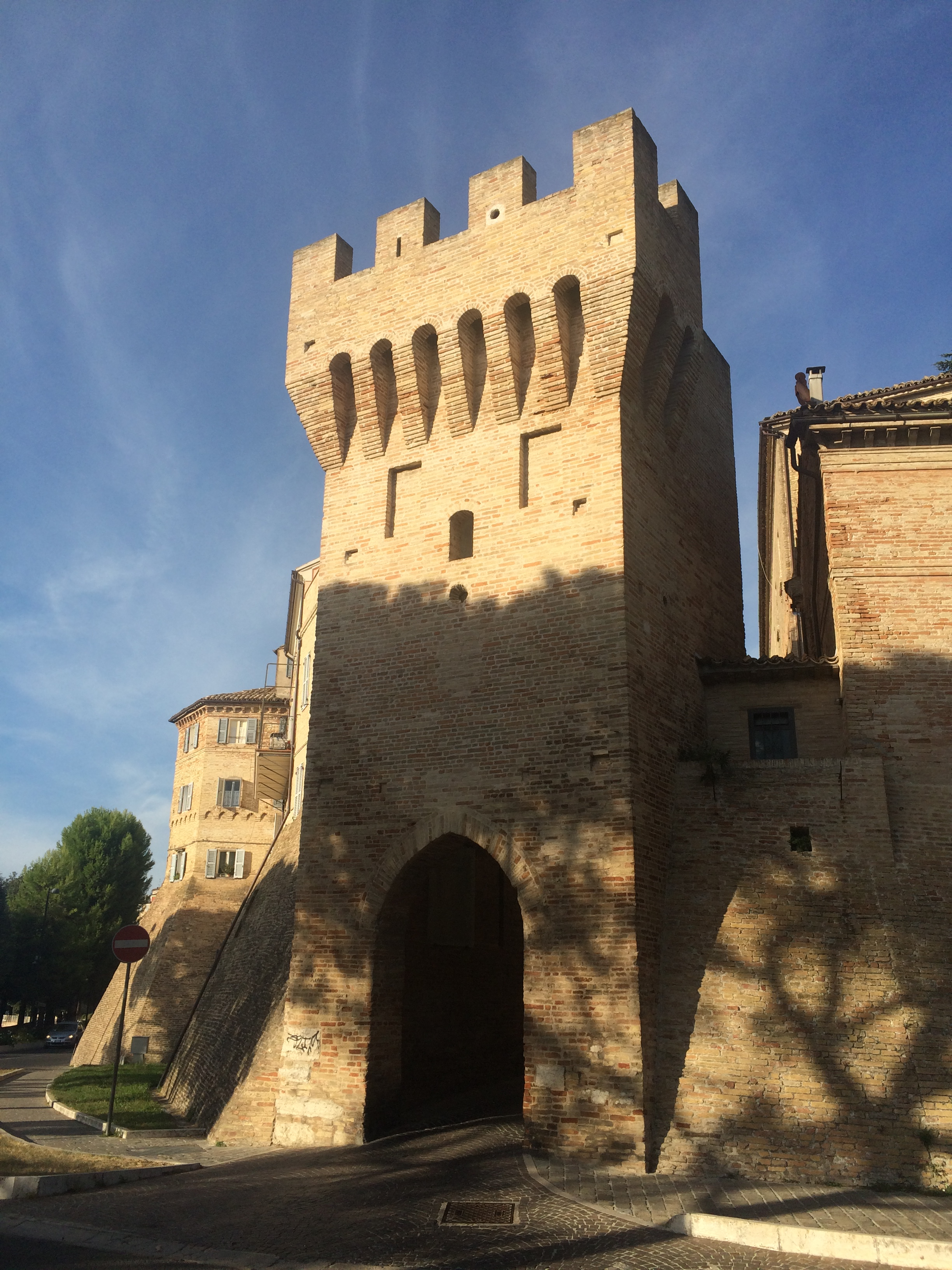
Porta Montana

==== Palaces ====
- Autopalazzo: the Autopalazzo (also known as the Palace or Garage Perogio) is a Liberty-style building built adjoining the western city walls of Macerata. It was completed in 1911 to a design by engineer Ugo Cantalamessa as a multifunctional workshop. Since 2014, after a brief period of closure, it has housed the offices of Confcommercio.
- Former Casa del Fascio. The Academy of Fine Arts of Macerata has recently acquired the building with the intention of redeveloping it (2025), with the aim of bringing together teaching activities currently carried out across several sites in the city. Located in the historic centre of Macerata and dating to the late 14th century, the building has undergone multiple demolitions and reconstructions over the years.
- Loggia del grano: the area where the building stands previously hosted the church of Santa Maria del Suffragio, completely destroyed by a fire in 1832. It is the work of the local artist Agostino Benedettelli who, in 1841, built it as a “Borsa” for the trade in grain and silk. It currently houses the Department of Political Science, Communication and International Relations of the University of Macerata.
- Loggia dei Mercanti: a historic building located in Piazza della Libertà. Originally intended to house the municipal steelyard for weighing grain, it was also a place for negotiation and the display of goods.
- Palazzo Buonaccorsi
- Palazzo Floriani Carradori
- Palazzo Ciccolini. The palace, located in the historic centre of the city, is now a university site. Inside it has rich 16th-century painted decoration, once attributed to the Bolognese artist Pellegrino Tibaldi but partly reassigned on documentary grounds to Giuliano di Camillo da Cingoli and Leonardo da Borgo Sansepolcro. Palazzo Ciccolini hosted meetings of the Accademia dei Catenati.
- Palazzo of the Bank of Italy. The building was created by connecting internal spaces by the Bank of Italy across adjacent pre-existing buildings: Palazzo Mozzi, Palazzo Silvestri and Palazzo Rotelli Lazzarini. In 2024 the entire complex was acquired by the University of Macerata.
- Palazzo Compagnoni Marefoschi
- Palazzo del Convitto Nazionale
- Palazzo Conventati
- Palazzo De Vico Ubaldini
- Palazzo del Governo
- Palazzo Galeotti. The palace now belongs to Fondazione Carima, which hosted its headquarters there from its origins until 2005. It was later granted on loan to the Academy of Fine Arts of Macerata. On the ground floor the GABA (Galleria Accademia Belle Arti di Macerata) was created, organising a continuous programme of exhibitions and events with leading figures in contemporary visual art.
- Former courthouse: a notable building that in the 17th–18th centuries housed the Monastery of Santa Chiara, with the adjoining church of the same name, now used as a reading room. In 1808, the church and monastery—following Napoleonic suppressions—were transferred to the state and transformed into a courthouse and judicial prison, a function the building retained until the 1960s; the monastery's old 17th-century chapel was used as the Court of Assizes. After restoration by the University of Macerata, it currently houses the Departments of Humanities and of Law of the university, while the mezzanine floor has become the seat of the State Library of Macerata.
- Palazzo del mutilato. The palace is the last among the buildings constructed in Macerata by architect Cesare Bazzani; built between 1930 and 1936, it synthesises the classical tradition with the modern rationalist current.
- Palazzo degli Studi
- Palazzo della Provincia
- Palazzo Palmucci dei Pellicani and Teatro della Filarmonica
- Palazzo Romani-Adami. The palace is the result of the union of multiple buildings, still readable on the main façade. From 1911 the property was acquired by banking institutions and later passed to the Cassa di risparmio della provincia di Macerata. Since 2001 Palazzo Romani-Adami has been part of the assets of Fondazione Carima, which after a major architectural restoration established its headquarters there. It was subsequently granted on loan to the University of Macerata.
- Palazzo Ricci
- Palazzo Torri
- Palazzo Ugolini. The first example of neoclassical architecture in Macerata, designed in 1793 for the Ugolini marquises by Giuseppe Valadier (also author of the arrangement of Rome's Piazza del Popolo). It currently houses the Department of Humanities (Languages, Mediation, History, Literature and Philosophy) of the University of Macerata.
- Former Seminary of Macerata: the building stands in the oldest area of Macerata, once occupied by the church and convent of St Augustine, documented since the 13th century. After the Napoleonic suppression the building was ceded by Pope Pius VII to Bishop Saint Vincenzo Maria Strambi, who transformed it into a seminary. It currently houses the Department of Economics and Law of the University of Macerata.

==== Villas ====
- Villa Cola
- Villa Compagnoni delle Lune in Cimarella
- Villa Giorgini
- Villa Boschetto Ricci

==== Theatres ====
- Sferisterio of Macerata: the Sferisterio is an open-air theatre located in the historic centre of Macerata. A semicircular arena originally intended for the game of pallone col bracciale, later adapted as a venue for concerts and opera, it is the only open-air theatre with boxes; its acoustics have been described as “perfect” by singers and orchestra conductors, and it hosts cultural festivals. The building was designed in 1823 by the neoclassical architect Ireneo Aleandri (designer, among other works, of the Ariccia viaduct and the Teatro Nuovo “Gian Carlo Menotti” in Spoleto). It has a maximum capacity of about 2,500 seats (up to 3,000 including the gallery) and since 1967 it has been known for its summer opera season, later transformed into the Sferisterio Opera Festival and then into the Macerata Opera Festival.
- Teatro Lauro Rossi
- Teatro della Filarmonica
- Roman theatre of Helvia Recina

==== Streets and squares ====
- Piazza della Libertà. Long the centre of city life, the main civic buildings of the city overlook it.
- Corso Cairoli.

==== Fountains and monuments ====
- Fonte maggiore. Dating to 1326, designed by Mastro Marabeo and his brother Domenico.
- I Cancelli. A cast-iron gate by Rodolfo Buccolini placed between two twin buildings designed by engineer Agostino Benedettelli.
- Monument of Victory.
- Civic tower (Torre dei Tempi) with an astronomical clock.
- Aula magna of the University of Macerata.

==== Military architecture ====
- City walls of Macerata
  - Porta del Mercato
  - Porta Montana
  - Porta San Giuliano
- Former Caserma Filippo Corridoni
- Former Caserma Castelfidardo. In the surviving part of the former barracks, in the rear section, after the Second World War the seat of the Liceo classico Giacomo Leopardi of Macerata was moved there.

=== Archaeological areas ===
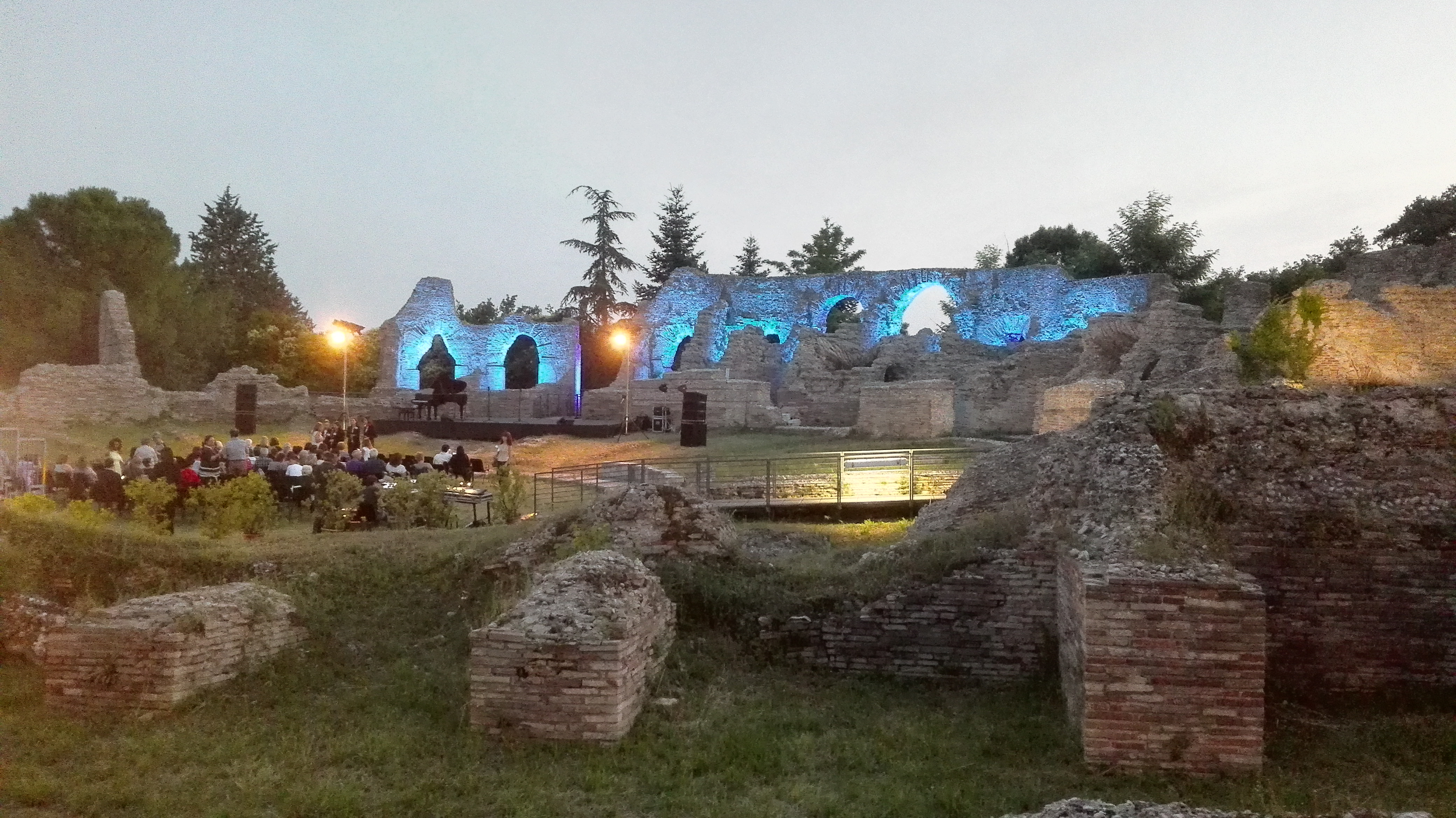
Roman ruins of the theatre of Helvia Recina.

- Archaeological area of the Roman city of Helvia Recina

=== Natural areas ===
- Giardini Diaz
- Parco di Fontescodella
- Parco di Villa Cozza
- Villa Lauri and its park.

=== Boroughs ===
- Borgo Villa Ficana

== Macerata Opera Festival ==
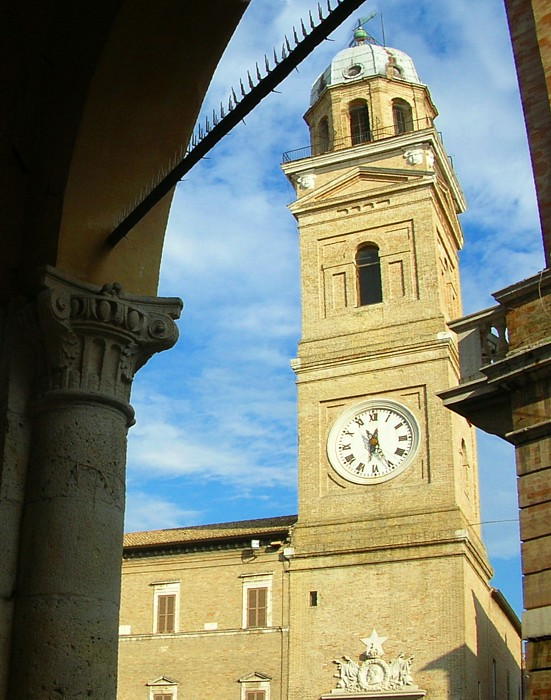
Macerata principal tower.

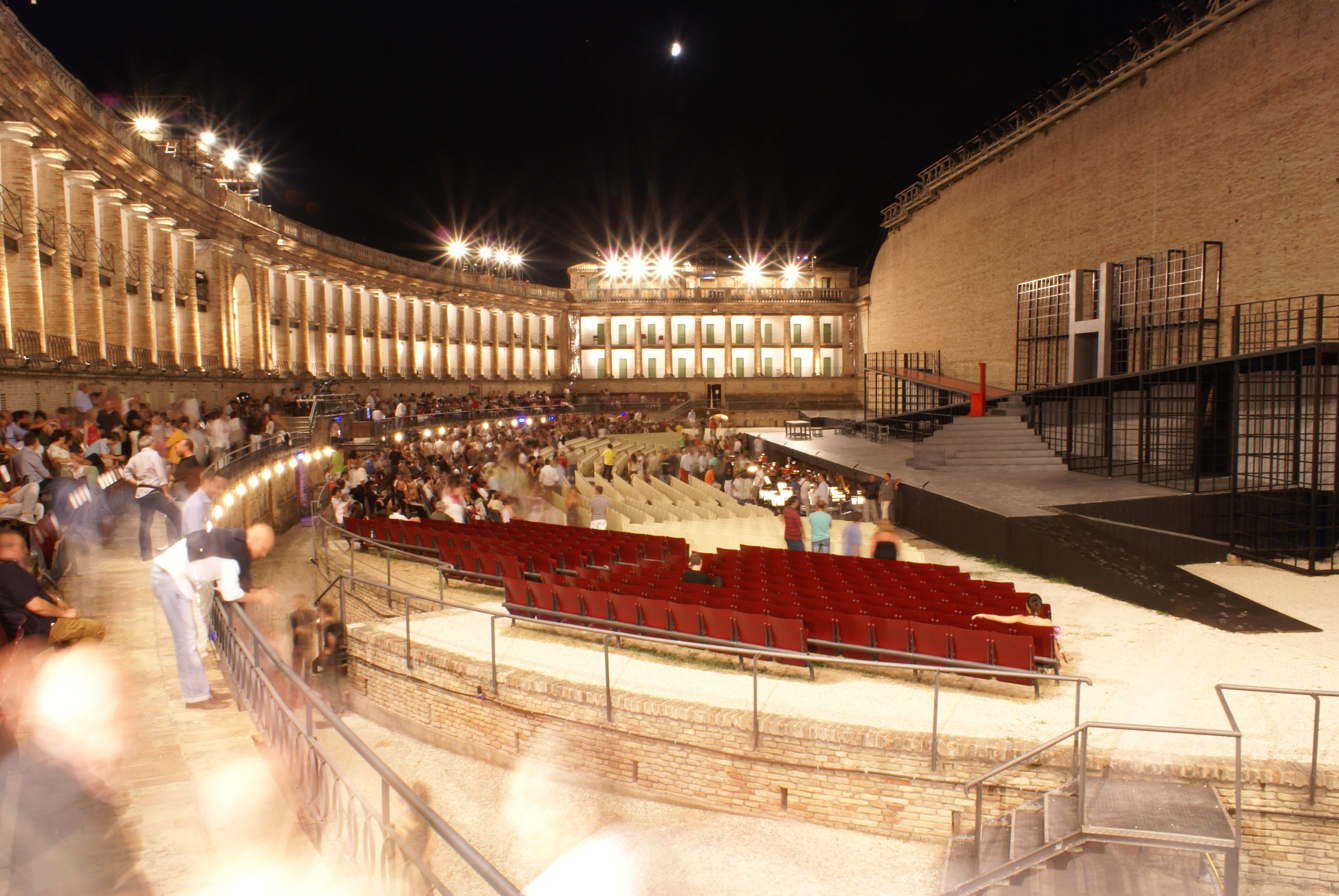
Sferisterio open-air theatre.

In July and August, the Sferisterio Opera Festival is held in the 2,500 seat Arena Sferisterio. It is a huge neoclassical arena erected in the 1820s as a stadium for a form of handball by the architect Ireneo Aleandri. The orchestra pit is so wide that musicians at each end cannot hear each other.

The first opera performed here was Giuseppe Verdi's Aida in 1921. It was promoted by the association "Società Cittadina" led by Count Pieralberto Conti. The arena was transformed into a real outdoor theatre with an enormous parabolic stage. The orchestra was placed immediately behind it and the seats were located around it. In the middle of the front sidewall a large door was built that allowed the entrance of the Egyptian conqueror. Posters were created by Verona's official Aida employee Plino Codognato and the painter Emilio Lazzari. The opera and its Triumphal March employed many people (in addition to about one thousand props and also different animals such as horses and camels). Francisca Solari interpreted Aida and Alessandro Dolci sang the great tenor role in the robes of Radames. The hospitality of Macerata grew quickly and new ways were developed to induce people to stay longer in the town, so the opera was repeated 17 times with more than seventy thousand attendees. The next year the opera La Gioconda was sung. Until 1927 no more shows were performed, at which time the famous tenor Beniamino Gigli sang a unique concert for the invalids of World War I.

From World War II until the 1960s, it was rare to have operas in the local "Bel Canto". In 1967, Carlo Perucci, a native of San Benedetto del Tronto (Marche), established the first stable local band with the song Circuito lirico delle Marche, so when he was in Macerata he asked the city hall to offer new performances. With enthusiasm the local administrators allowed him to offer new extraordinary contracts: Giuseppe Verdi's Otello (with Del Monaco and Protti), and Giacomo Puccini's Madama Butterfly (with Antonietta Stella and Nicola Ruggeri). Finally, on 3 August, the musical season began, and continues to today.

Overall the Sferisterio is very relevant, compared sometimes to Italy's famous Arena di Verona and Caracalla operas. During this period, about 28 years, when Carlo Perucci was artistic director, the "Sferisterio" Arena, because of its perfect acoustics, housed the most important international voices of bel canto. Ballets with Fracci and Nureyev were performed. The presentations of Bohème by Ken Russell in 1984 and Enrico Job's Don Giovanni were particularly memorable. Other outstanding shows were La traviata and Lucia di Lammermoor, with stage design by Czech scenographer Josef Svoboda, Hugo De Ana's Turandot and De Flò's Faust and Tosca. In the late nineties, led by Orazi as artistic director, the most important singers of the world performed in the Macerata Opera, performing in both the Sferisterio and the Lauro Rossi theaters: Franco Corelli, Birgit Nilsson, Luciano Pavarotti, Plácido Domingo, Montserrat Caballé, Marilyn Horne, Fiorenza Cossotto, Ruggero Raimondi, Mariella Devia, José Carreras, Katia Ricciarelli, Renato Bruson, and Raina Kabaivanska.

Since 1990, some operas have been performed in the 550-seat Teatro Lauro Rossi following extensive renovation, which was completed in 1989. Originally named the Teatro dei Condomini and built by Cosimo Morelli on a project by Antonio Bibiena in 1767, it opened in 1774 with Pasquale Anfossi's Olimpiade. In 1872, it was renamed after the musician Lauro Rossi who was born in the town.

This positive situation made the Sferisterio Opera a success. By 1992 the organization had won the "Franco Abbiati award of Italian musical Critics" three times. Other prestigious Italian lyric events reproduce the Sferisterio's events: Opera di Roma, Teatro Comunale di Bologna and La Scala di Milano.

2006 was the year of transformation led by the new artistic director Pier Luigi Pizzi. The summer event became a "Festival". He gave all of his 50 years of experience. Pizzi's career as the opera's director, designer, and dresser earned many awards. The season started with a dominant theme that marks all the shows and their sets. The parabolic stage was recovered, reviving the old atmosphere of the Handball Stadium. In that year, Mozart's 250th anniversary, the theme of "initiatory journey" opened with the Magic Flute by the Austrian musician. From that moment in every season the choice of operas was marked by a fil rouge theme, demonstrating the great intellectual vitality of opera: il Gioco dei Potenti in 2007 with Macbeth, Maria Stuarda, Norma and the gala dance with Roberto Bolle and Alessandra Ferri; "La seduzione" in 2008 when the two-time Oscar-winning citizen of Macerata, Dante Ferretti, was hired as director; L'inganno in 2009 with Don Giovanni and Madama Butterfly.

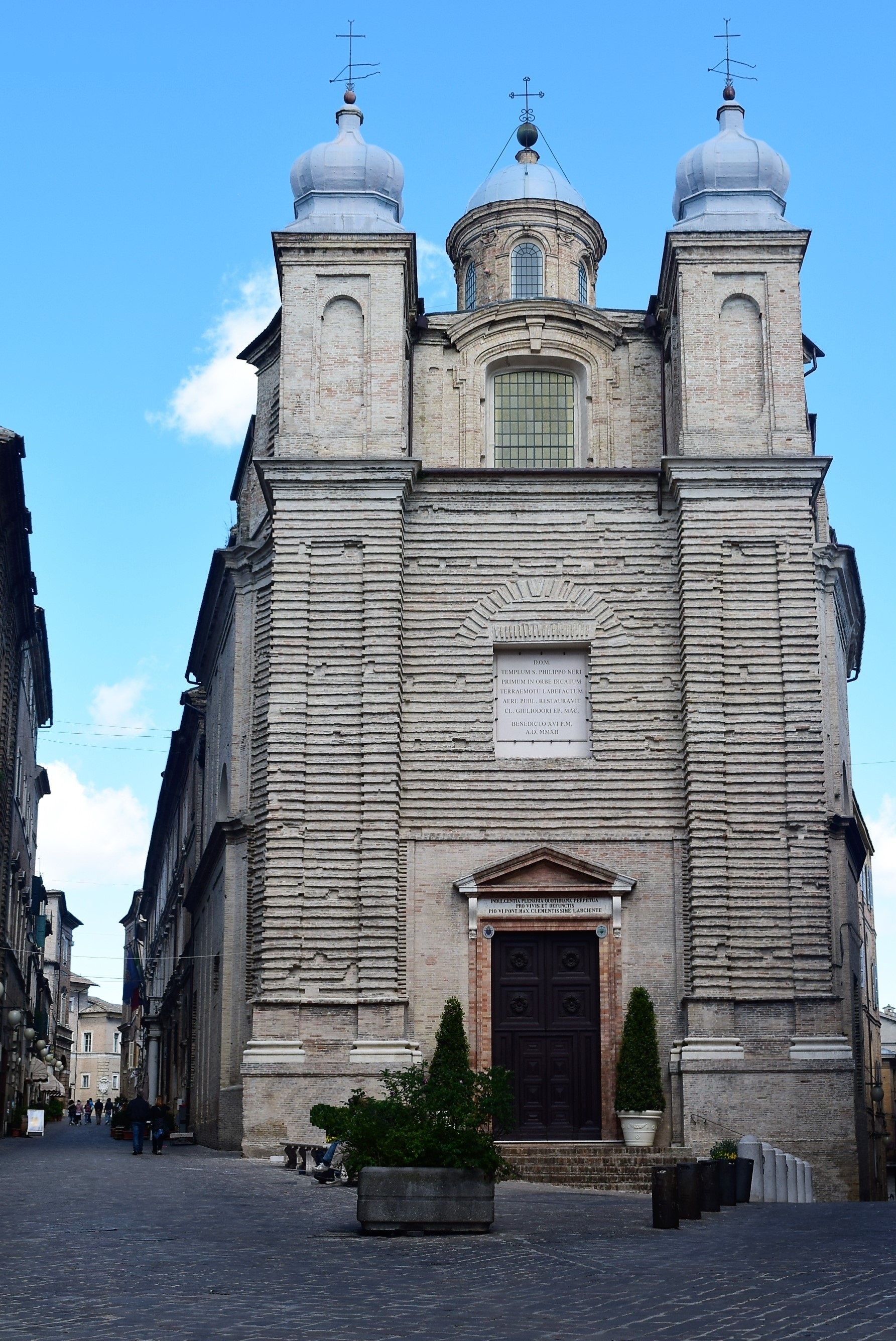
Chiesa di San Filippo Neri

== Macerata–Loreto pilgrimage ==
Every year since 1978, a 27 km pilgrimage from Macerata to Loreto has taken place on the first Saturday of June after school has finished. Though it attracts believers from all over the world, those from neighbouring cities and regions are especially numerous. Its main purpose is to revive an old tradition of gratitude of students to Mary for the end of the school year. Each iteration, more pilgrims have taken part, their number having grown from just three hundred to sixty thousand pilgrims. Overnight, participants are led through the hills along a road traditionally held to be a Marian path. A rood donated by Pope John Paul II, who chaired at the Mass in 1993, heads the procession. The night march is diligently guided and accompanied by recitations of the Rosary, songs, testimonies, meditations on the Word of God and the teachings of the Pope.

== Economy ==
Macerata acts as a service and commercial centre for its hinterland, which remains partly agricultural. Local industry is active in the mechanical, food-processing, furniture-making and construction sectors.

The city is also an agricultural market for cereals; the surrounding area is noted for livestock breeding (including cattle and pigs), horticulture and floriculture. Reported industries include brewing, brickmaking and furniture manufacturing.

Traditional artisan activities reported for the area include the manufacture of wind instruments and textile weaving (including carpets and other products characterised by fine artistic motifs). Goldsmithing, ceramics and wickerwork are also documented.

In the wider provincial economy, manufacturing has included leather goods and footwear, clothing, paper and food processing, with a productive structure characterised by small and medium-sized enterprises. The broader local industrial context also includes the Fermano–Maceratese leather and footwear district, recognised in regional and national policy documentation.

== Cuisine ==
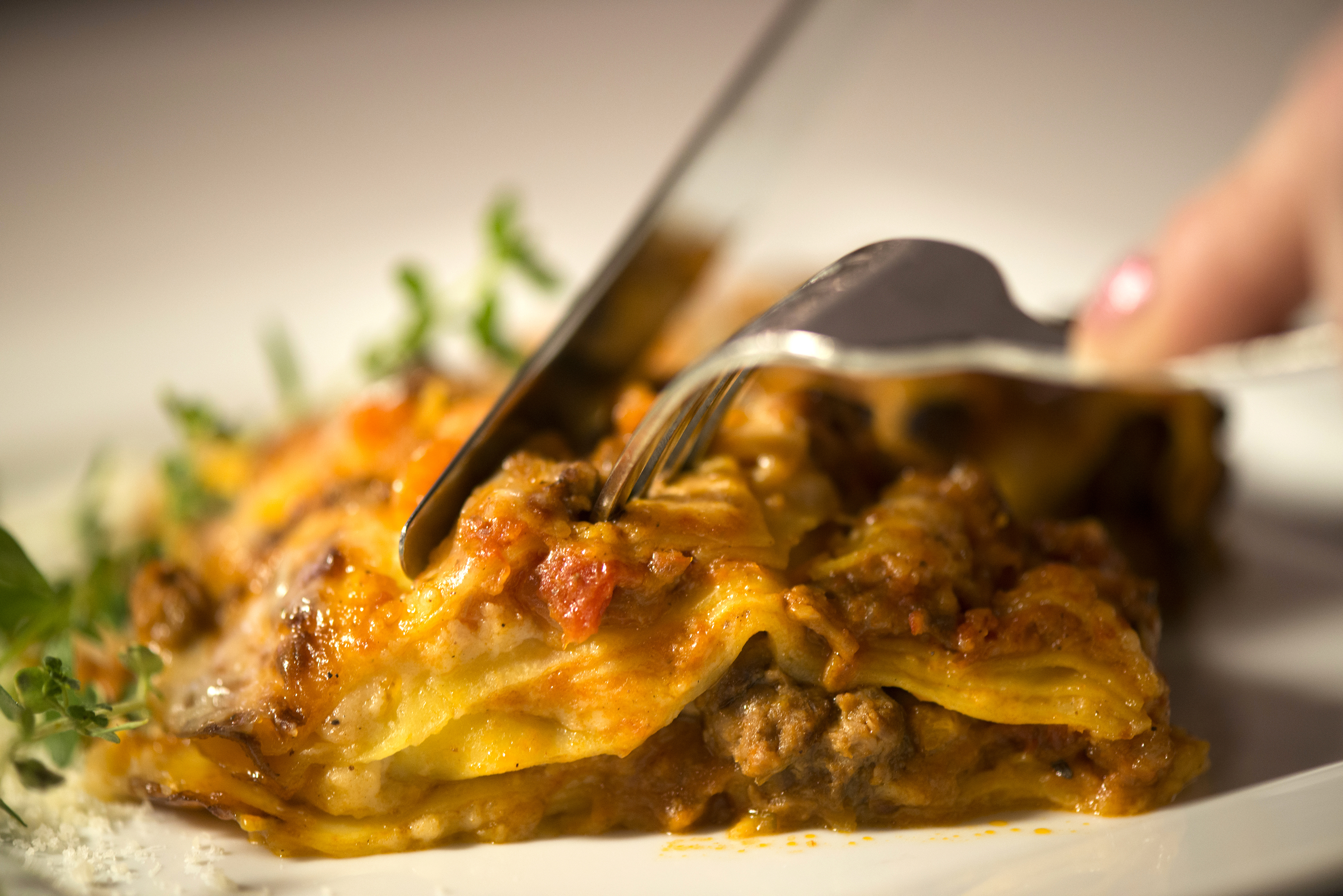
Vincisgrassi alla maceratese, a traditional baked pasta dish associated with the Macerata area.

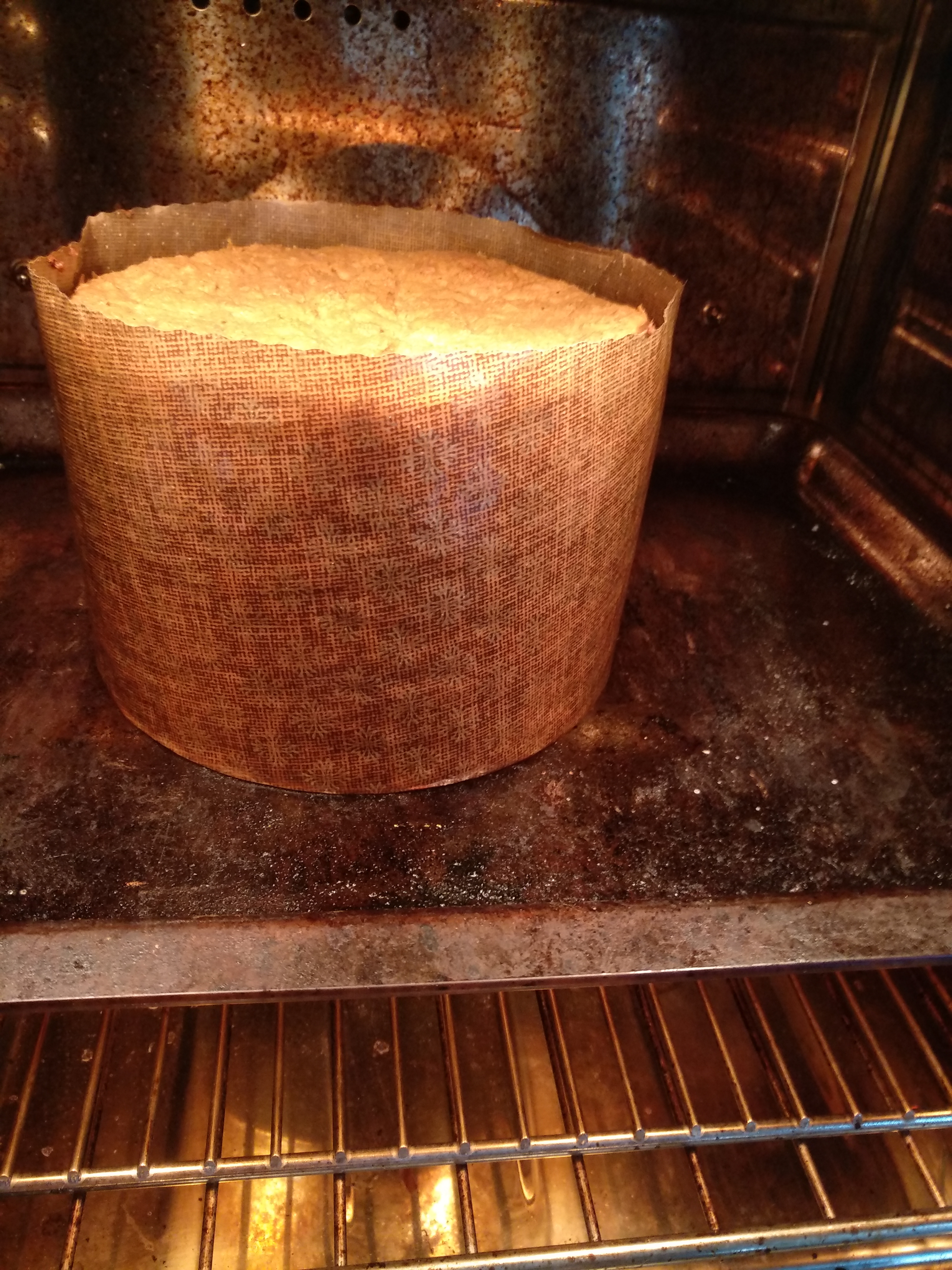
Crescia (also known locally as pizza di Pasqua), a traditional Easter cheese bread in central Marche.

Macerata's local food traditions reflect the inland cuisine of the Marche region, shaped by farming, livestock breeding and seasonal produce.

A widely cited emblematic first course in the Macerata area is vincisgrassi alla maceratese, a rich, layered baked pasta dish; it is documented within Italy's traditional speciality guaranteed (TSG/STG) framework. Another traditional preparation recorded for the region is frascarelli (also described as “rice in polenta”), based on flour and water and often served with savoury condiments.

Among the more substantial main dishes and rustic preparations, sources commonly mention trippa alla marchigiana (tripe stewed with tomato and aromatics). Rabbit dishes are also characteristic of inland Marche cooking; one noted example is coniglio in porchetta (rabbit cooked with aromatic herbs, typically including wild fennel).

Charcuterie features prominently in the area's antipasti; ciauscolo (a soft, spreadable cured sausage) is protected at EU level as a PGI/IGP product and is frequently cited among typical local foods.

Seasonal vegetables are also part of local tradition, including cardoons (locally often called gobbi in the Macerata area), which are especially associated with winter cooking.

Local festive food customs include potato gnocchi dressed with duck ragù (gnocchi con la papera), traditionally linked in Macerata to celebrations for the patron saint, Saint Julian (San Giuliano).

Typical baked goods in central Marche include crescia (also referred to locally as pizza di Pasqua when made as an Easter cheese bread), documented for the Ancona–Macerata area.

Traditional sweets documented for the Macerata area include scroccafusi/scoccafusi (Carnival fried pastries, often finished with honey or liqueur-based glaze) and local ring-shaped cakes such as ciammellottu, commonly served with vino cotto in rural tradition.

== Human geography ==
=== Neighbourhoods ===
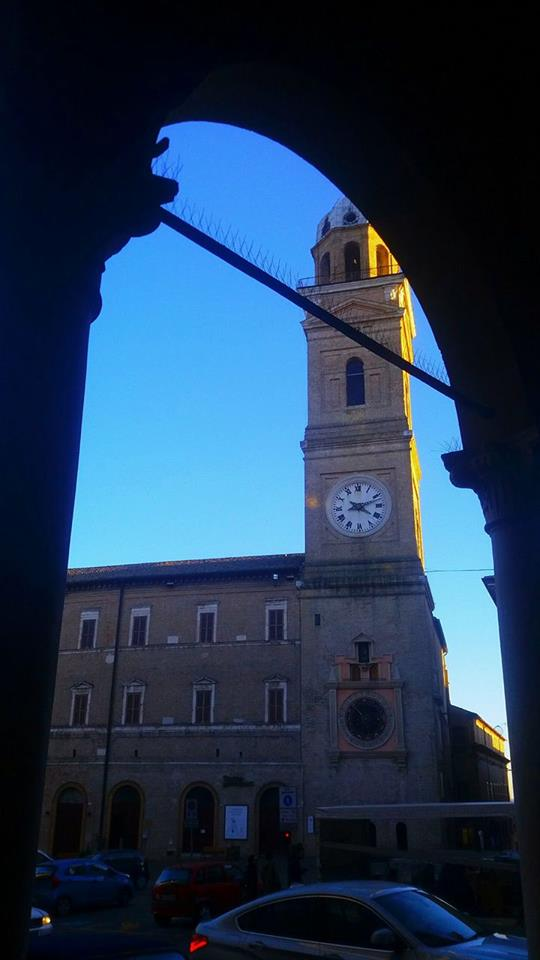
Civic tower in Piazza della Libertà

- Historic centre (Piazza della Libertà)
- Borgo San Giuliano (Le Fosse)
- Corso Cairoli (Le Casette)
- Corso Cavour – Piazza Pizzarello
- Stadio – Due Fonti – Terria – Fontezucca
- Fontescodella – Tribunale
- Rione Marche
- La Pace
- Santa Croce – Borgo Ficana
- Colleverde – Montalbano
- Collevario
- San Francesco – Spalato
- Vergini
- Santa Lucia – Corneto
- Montanello – Madonna del Monte
- Villa Potenza
- Sforzacosta
- Piediripa

== Notable people ==
- Enrico Accorretti (1888–1978), admiral during World War II
- Basilio Basili (1804–1895), opera singer and composer was born in Macerata in 1804.
- Dante Ferretti (born 1943), production designer, was born in Macerata.
- Pietro Paolo Floriani (1585–1638), architect and military engineer was born in Macerata.
- Camila Giorgi (born 1991), tennis player
- Ivo Pannaggi, Futurist painter and Bauhaus architect, was born and died in Macerata (1901–81). A high school in town was dedicated in his name.
- Matteo Ricci (1552–1610), Jesuit and the first European to enter the Forbidden City in the Chinese capital.
- Giuseppe Tucci (1894–1984), scholar of oriental cultures, was born in Macerata.

== Twin towns – sister cities ==
Macerata is twinned with:

- Weiden in der Oberpfalz, Germany (since 1963).
- Issy-les-Moulineaux, France (since 1982).
- Floriana, Malta (since 2007).
- Kamëz, Albania (since 2010).
- Taicang, China (since 2020).
- Lanciano, Italy (since 3 June 2023).

== Sources ==
- E.H. Ercoli. Sferisterio. Macerata, Associazione Arena Sferisterio, 2007
- A. Adversi, D. Cecchi, L. Paci (a cura di). Storia di Macerata. Macerata, 1972
- G. Capici (a cura di). Sphaeristerium. Roma, 1989
- F. Torresi (a cura di). La città sul palcoscenico. Macerata, 1997

== See also ==
- Macerata railway station
- S.S. Maceratese 1922
- Volley Lube
- Diocese of Macerata
- Madonna di Macerata
