= Rebel =

A rebel is a participant in a rebellion.

Rebel or rebels may also refer to:

== People ==
- Rebel (given name)
- Rebel (surname)
- Patriot (American Revolution), during the American Revolution
- American Southerners, as a form of self-identification; see Southern United States
- DJ Rebel (born 1984), or simply Rebel, Belgian DJ
- Johnny Reb, or Johnny Rebel, the national personification of the Southern states of the United States
- In professional wrestling:
  - Rebel (wrestler), American professional wrestler
  - Rockin' Rebel, American professional wrestler
  - The Rebel, a nickname for American professional wrestler Dick Slater
  - The Rebel, a nickname for American professional wrestler David Finlay

== Organizations and brands ==
- Rebel (company), a sport equipment retailer in Australia and New Zealand
- Rebel (entertainment complex), an entertainment complex in Toronto, Ontario, Canada
- Rebel (Denmark), a Danish youth organization
- Murphy Rebel, an airplane model by Murphy Aircraft
- REBEL (chess), a chess program
- Rebel (train), a type of train
- Reaching Everyone By Exposing Lies, a New Jersey anti-tobacco program
- Rebels Motorcycle Club, Australia, New Zealand
- Rebels Motorcycle Club (Canada)
- Rebel, a beer brand produced by Havlíčkobrodsko brewery in Havlíčkův Brod, Czech Republic
- Rebel, a brand name of camera; see Canon EOS

=== Vehicles ===
- Rambler Rebel automobiles
- AMC Rebel automobiles
- Reliant Rebel automobiles
- Honda CM series motorcycles

== Sports team names ==
- Berlin Rebels, an American football team from Berlin, Germany
- Dublin Rebels, an American Football team from Dublin, Ireland
- Franklin High School (Tennessee)
- Melbourne Rebels, a rugby union team
- Melbourne Rebels (ARC), a former rugby union team
- Ole Miss Rebels, University of Mississippi
- Port Perry High School, Ontario, Canada
- Saint Louis Priory School, Creve Coeur, Missouri
- Somerset Rebels, the British Speedway Premier league team based in Somerset
- South High School (Bakersfield, California)
- South Burlington High School, Vermont
- UNLV Rebels, University of Nevada, Las Vegas
- Utah Tech University in St George, Utah, formerly called their athletic teams the Rebels, when known as Dixie State University and similar names

== Books ==
- Rebel (novel), a 1969 novel by Bediako Asare
- Rebel Magazine, a British fashion and lifestyle magazine
- Rebel, a 1986 graphic novel by Pepe Moreno
- Rebel, the first book of The Starbuck Chronicles, a series by Bernard Cornwell
- R.E.B.E.L.S., two separate fictional revolutionary paramilitary groups in the DC Comics Universe
- Rebel, a 2019 novel by Marie Lu

== Film and television ==
- Rebel (1985 film), starring Matt Dillon
- Rebel (2012 film), an Indian Telugu-language action film by Raghava Lawrence, starring Prabhas (the actor also nicknamed "Rebel")
- Rebel (2014 film), a Canadian short documentary film by Elle-Máijá Tailfeathers
- Rebel (2015 film), an Indian Kannada-language action film directed by Rajendra Singh Babu
- Rebel (2022 film), a Belgian film by Adil El Arbi and Bilall Fallah
- Rebel (2024 film), an Indian Tamil-language film
- Rebel (2017 TV series), a 2017 Black Entertainment Television police drama
- Rebel (2021 TV series), a 2021 ABC drama inspired by the life of Erin Brockovich
- Rebel (Iranian TV series), an Iranian TV series made for Filimo's home show service
- Rebelové (Rebels), a 2001 Czech musical film
- "Rebels" (Law & Order), a 1995 episode of Law & Order
- Micah Sanders, also known as Rebel, a character in the TV series Heroes
- Star Wars Rebels, a 2014 animated TV series set in the Star Wars universe
  - a member of the Rebel Alliance in the Star Wars universe

== Music ==
- Rebel Records, an American record label

=== Albums ===
- Rebel (John Miles album) or the title song, 1976
- Rebel (Lecrae album), 2008
- Rebel (Lynch Mob album), 2015
- Rebel (Anne Wilson album), 2024
- Rebel (EsDeeKid album), 2025
- Rebel (soundtrack), by Matt Dillon and Debbie Byrne, from the 1985 film
- Rebel, by Buzy, 1989
- Rebel, by Kourosh Yaghmaei, 2024
- Rebels (album), by RBD, 2006
- Rebels (EP), by Black Veil Brides, 2011

=== Songs ===
- "Rebel", by Bryan Adams from Into the Fire, 1987
- "Rebel", by Five for Fighting from Bookmarks, 2013
- "Rebel", by Roger Daltrey from Under a Raging Moon, 1985
- "Rebel" (TVXQ song), 2023
- "Rebels" (song), by Tom Petty and the Heartbreakers, 1985
- "Rebels", by Matchbox Twenty from Where the Light Goes, 2023

== See also ==
- The Rebel (disambiguation)
- The Rebels (disambiguation)
- Reb (disambiguation)
- Reble, stagename of Daiaphi Lamare, an Indian rapper and songwriter
