= Le Rebelle =

Le Rebelle is French for "the rebel". It may refer to:

- The Rebel (1931 film), a film directed by Adelqui Migliar
- The Rebel (1980 French film), a film directed by Gérard Blain

== See also ==
- The Rebel (disambiguation)
