= THG plc =

British e-commerce retail company

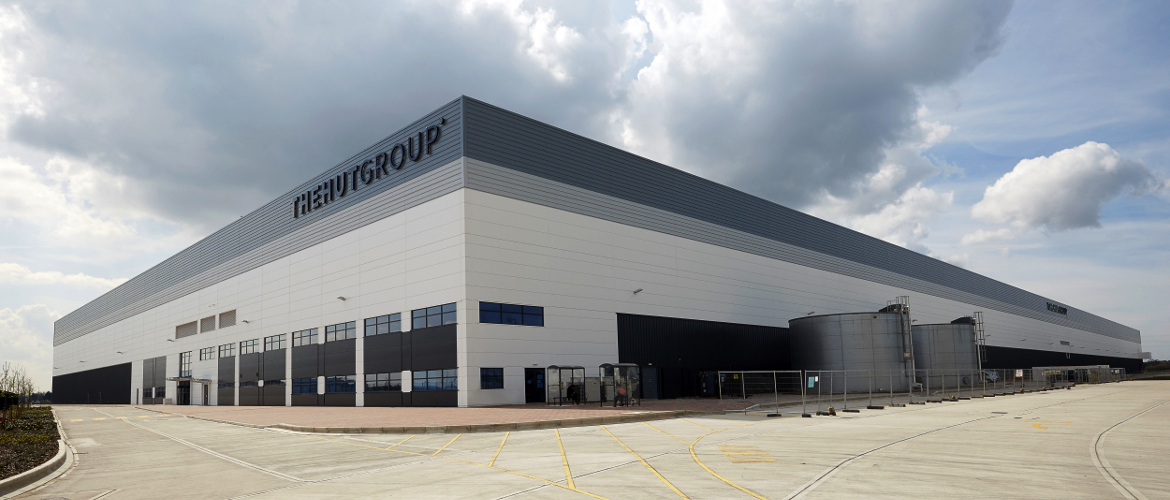
- THG distribution centre in Warrington, Cheshire
- Trade name: THG
- Formerly: The Hut Group
- Type: Public limited company
- Traded as: LSE: THG
- ISIN: GB00BMTV7393
- Industry: E-commerce
- Founded: 2004; 22 years ago in Manchester, England
- Founders: Matthew Moulding; John Gallemore
- Headquarters: Manchester Airport, Manchester, England
- Area served: Worldwide
- Key people: Charles Allen (chairman); Matthew Moulding (CEO)
- Products: Cosmetics; Dietary supplements
- Brands: Ameliorate; Biossance; Christophe Robin; Cult Beauty; Dermstore; ESPA; Glossybox; Lookfantastic; Myprotein; Perricone MD
- Revenue: ▼£1,717.9 million (2025)
- Operating income: ▲£8.1 million (2025)
- Net income: ▲£54.1 million (2025)
- Total assets: ▼£1,599.2 million (2025)
- Total equity: ▲£425.2 million (2025)
- Number of employees: 2,912 (2025)
- Divisions: Beauty; Nutrition
- Website: thg.com

THG plc, an initialism of its original name The Hut Group, is a global retailer and brand owner, headquartered in Manchester, England, operating through two predominantly online consumer businesses: THG Beauty and THG Nutrition. In January 2025, THG plc demerged its technology and logistics arm, THG Ingenuity, into a privately owned, stand-alone business. THG plc is listed on the London Stock Exchange and is a constituent of the FTSE 250 Index.

== History ==
The company was founded in Manchester in 2004 with a £500,000 investment by Matt Moulding and John Gallemore. The company sold CDs and DVDs online before creating white-label web stores for large physical retailers, including Asda, Argos Entertainment, Tesco and WHSmith. It operated a warehouse in Guernsey, allowing customers to avoid paying VAT on items priced below £18.

The creation of the iPhone in 2007 undermined this business model and The Hut Group began acquiring internet retailers and moving them into the group's existing systems and warehouses. The company purchased Zavvi in 2009, Lookfantastic in 2010 and Myprotein in 2011. The group focused on beauty and lifestyle products because of the large margins and potential for international scaling.

Investors included Terry Leahy, a former chief executive of Tesco, and Stuart Rose, the chairman of Ocado. In 2014, the company sold a 19.2% stake to KKR, while Balderton Capital, a technology investor, held an identical stake. BlackRock invested £138 million in February 2016, and Sofina announced an undisclosed equity stake in May 2016. In August 2017, Sky News reported that Old Mutual Global Investors had made their first private equity investment in The Hut Group. In 2017, The Hut Group was valued at more than £2.5 billion making it one of the most valuable private companies in the United Kingdom, and one of the UK's unicorn companies.

On 16 September 2020, THG floated on the London Stock Exchange, the largest IPO on the LSE since 2013. The share price rose in value by 25% on the first day of trading, generating £920m for the company and £961m for the company's owners. After the flotation, Moulding received one of the biggest payouts in UK corporate history of at least £830m in shares.

However, by early October 2021, THG's share price had fallen by more than 60% since the start of the year. On 12 October 2021, the company held a capital markets day to unveil its sustainability strategy with investors. Afterwards, shares fell by 35%, wiping £1.8 billion off THG's value.

Following criticism of the company's governance arrangements, Charles Allen replaced Moulding as chairman in March 2022, with Moulding remaining CEO.

In July 2023, THG confirmed the sale of its OnDemand division to the existing leadership team, with financial backing from investment firm Gordon Brothers. The division included the webstores IWOOT, My Geek Box, Pop In A Box, Very Neko and Zavvi. ProBikeKit was sold separately to Frasers Group in the second quarter of 2023. The sales generated £4 million and THG announced that both would continue as clients of THG Ingenuity. Arrow Films was retained by THG and moved into THG Ingenuity.

In June 2024, it was announced that THG had sold its Luxury division, including the designer clothing, accessories and homeware web stores, Allsole, Coggles, MyBag and The Hut, to Frasers Group.

In January 2025, Ingenuity demerged from THG plc into a privately owned, stand-alone business.

In August 2026, THG plc disposed Claremont Ingredients for £103m.

== Products and services ==
=== Beauty ===
THG Beauty sells own-brand and third party cosmetics, including skincare, haircare, makeup and fragrances.

It both owns brands (Ameliorate, Biossance, Christophe Robin, ESPA and Perricone MD) and its own web stores (Lookfantastic, Cult Beauty, and Dermstore). Each web store is localised to different territories, including localised pricing, promotions, content, marketing, influencers, customer service, couriers and payment options. It offers three subscription services through Lookfantastic, Dermstore, and Glossybox which are designed to introduce consumers to new THG products.

The division has its own product development and manufacturing facilities (THG Labs in the UK and Bentley Laboratories in the USA) for both own-brands and third parties.

=== Nutrition ===
THG Nutrition is a retailer of sports nutrition supplements and health and wellness products, led by the world's largest online sports nutrition brand, Myprotein. It also includes supplements brand, Myvitamins and the activewear brand, MP Activewear. Like the Beauty division, THG Nutrition is vertically integrated with its own localised web stores, product development and manufacturing facilities which also service third parties.

== Facilities and locations ==
THG's head office is at the purpose-built ICON Technology Campus at Manchester Airport which opened in 2021.

In 2020, THG exchanged contracts to build a new 1m sq ft global headquarters at Airport City Manchester to be called THQ. It was due for completion in 2022 but work had not yet begun by October 2022.

== Acquisitions ==
THG has pursued an acquisition strategy of mainly taking full ownership of e-commerce businesses in a variety of retail sectors and putting the websites onto the e-commerce platform, THG Ingenuity.

Acquisitions
Company	Year	Paid	Description	Rebranded	Division	Ref
Zavvi	2009		An online entertainment business that had gone into administration in 2008. Sold with the OnDemand division in 2023.		Sold (2023)	
IWOOT - I Want One of Those	2010	£0.6M	Bought from Findel Group as well as Confetti, a wedding accessories retailer. Sold with the OnDemand division in 2023.		Sold (2023)	
MyBag	2010		Designer handbags and accessories retailer. Sold to Frasers Group in 2024.		Sold (2024)	
Lookfantastic	2010	£19.4M	Bought from the Crown family, the business sold beauty, skincare and haircare products and operated beauty salons in the UK.		Beauty	
Mankind	2010	£2.5M	Bought weeks after purchasing Lookfantastic Group, Mankind is a male-focused online grooming retailer. At the time, it reported £5M annual sales.		Beauty	
HQhair	2011		Bought out of administration.		Discontinued (2021)	
Myprotein	2011	£60M	The deal was estimated at £60 million at the time of the announcement.		Nutrition	
Coggles	2013		Bought from Administration. Originally a predominantly physical retailer based in York, it operated solely online until December 2017 when it launched a new flagship store in Alderley Edge, Cheshire. Sold to Frasers Group in 2024.		Sold (2024)	
Active Nutrition International	2014		A Finnish online sports nutrition retailer, Mass.fi, discontinued in 2017.		Discontinued (2017)	
ProBikeKit	2013		Online UK cycling equipment and accessories retailer. Sold to Frasers Group in 2023.		Sold (2023)	
Preloved	2014		An online secondhand marketplace founded by Ian Buzer in 1998. It was one of the largest in the UK with over 6 million members.		Ingenuity (demerged 2025)	
Pop In A Box	2015		Online retailer of Funko Pop! Vinyl figures and accessories. Sold with the OnDemand division in 2023.		Sold (2023)	
My Geek Box	2015		Subscription box service for collectibles and toys. Sold with the OnDemand division in 2023.		Sold (2023)	
Mio Skincare	2015	£3.7M	British skincare brand.		Discontinued (2025)	
Grow Gorgeous	2016		Canadian haircare brand acquired from Deciem.		Discontinued (2025)	
SkinStore	2016	£17.9M	An online-only beauty retailer in the USA and Australia, purchased from Walgreens Boots Alliance.		Discontinued (2025)	
Hale Country Club & Spa	2016	£23.8M	The group's first physical retail acquisition.		Ingenuity (demerged 2025)	
IdealShape	2016	£30.7M	A US-based dieting and nutrition brand based in American Fork, Utah.	exante	Discontinued (2024)	
SkinCareRx	2016	£4.4M	US based online skin care product store.		Discontinued (2025)	
Hangar Seven	2017	£9.2M	A UK-based digital content studio.	THG Studios	Ingenuity (demerged 2025)	
UK2 Group	2017	£58M	A web hosting firm with data centres around the world.	THG Ingenuity Cloud Services	Ingenuity (demerged 2025)	
RY	2017	£6.8M	An Australian beauty online retailer. RY, which stands for 'Recreate Yourself', was established by James Patten and Brad Carr in 2005, purchased by THG in 2017 and sold back to its founders in 2025.		Sold (2025)	
Glossybox	2017	£17.5M	A European provider of beauty box subscription services. It was bought from Rocket Internet and Kinnevik Online.		Beauty	
ESPA	2017	£68.2M	A UK firm with a presence in more than 700 spas in 60 countries.		Beauty	
Illamasqua	2017	£16.9M	A British make-up brand founded in 2006 by Julian Kynaston.		Discontinued (2025)	
Eyeko	2018	£16.5M	A specialist eye cosmetic brand.		Discontinued (2025)	
Language Connect	2018	£12.7M	An online translation company.	THG Fluently	Ingenuity (demerged 2025)	
Acheson & Acheson	2018	£52.8M	A cosmetics developer and manufacturer based in Trowbridge and Frome. Purchase included Acheson's own skincare brand, Ameliorate.	THG Labs	Beauty	
Christophe Robin	2019	£44.7M	A French haircare brand established in 1999.		Beauty	
Eclectic Hotel Group	2019	£39.9M	The Manchester hotels, King Street Townhouse and Great John Street Hotel.		Ingenuity (demerged 2025)	
Perricone MD	2020	£51M	US prestige skincare brand.		Beauty	
David Berryman Limited	2020	£7.5M	A fruit-based ingredients supplier and canned drinks manufacturer based in Luton.		Nutrition	
Claremont Ingredients Limited	2020	£61.1M	A manufacturer of liquid and powder flavourings and colourings based in Silverdale, Staffordshire. Sold to Nactarome Group for £103M in 2025.		Sold (2025)	
Dermstore	2020	£260.9M	US skincare retailer acquired from Target Corporation.		Beauty	
Indigo Environmental Limited	2021	£6.3M	A recycling facility in Widnes, and Three Counties Reclamation Limited, a recycling facility in Ludlow.	THG Eco	Ingenuity (demerged 2025)	
Arrow Films	2021	£18.5M	A British film distributor. The purchase also included The Engine House Media Services, a subtitling and audio description company.		Ingenuity (demerged 2025)	
More Trees	2021	£3.2M	A tree planting service.	THG Eco	Ingenuity (demerged 2025)	
Private Label Nutrition	2021	£2.7M	A vitamin, mineral and supplement manufacturer based in Blackpool.		Nutrition	
Preston Plastics Limited	2021	£18.9M	A plastic recycling facility in Preston, Lancashire.	THG Eco	Ingenuity (demerged 2025)	
Brighter Foods Limited	2021	£43.8M	A manufacturer and developer of cold-pressed and cold form snack bars in Tywyn, Wales.		Nutrition	
Bentley Laboratories LLC	2021	£180M	A prestige skincare and haircare manufacturer in Edison, New Jersey.		Beauty	
Morvélo	2021	£0.6M	A British cycling apparel brand. Sold to Frasers Group in 2023.		Sold (2023)	
Cult Beauty	2021	£291.3M	A UK-based online beauty retailer.		Beauty	
City A.M.	2023	£1.5M	A business-focused newspaper distributed in and around London.		Ingenuity (demerged 2025)	
Biossance	2023	£15.7M	Prestige skincare brand acquired at auction from Amyris, Inc.		Beauty	

== Controversies ==
=== Litigation ===
In 2014, The Hut Group sued Oliver Cookson for £15 million, alleging that he and his off-shore trust had overstated the profits of Myprotein prior to its acquisition by The Hut Group in 2011. Cookson counter sued for £12.7 million claiming a breach of warranty and fraudulent misrepresentation. The matter went to the High Court in London in October 2014 and, after a month-long trial, judgement was given by William Blair in November 2014 awarding Cookson an overall net result win of £6.5m in damages.

At the costs hearing in December 2014, the judge awarded a payment of just under £7.5 million to be made by The Hut Group to Cookson and the Trust in respect of all of the claims and counterclaims in the action and one third of the costs incurred by Cookson and the Trust.

Cookson and the Trust appealed the court's decision to award The Hut Groups damages. The court of appeal dismissed the appeal on 22 March 2016.

=== Property ownership ===
In January 2021, investors raised questions over the company's property deal with its CEO and co-founder, Matt Moulding. Moulding sold himself many of the company's property assets, which he then is reported to rent back to THG for £19m annually. In November 2024, it was reported that Moulding had sold the ICON campus, the site of THG's headquarters.
