= Reibel =

Reibel is a surname. Notable people with the surname include:

- Charles Reibel (1882–1966), French lawyer and politician
- Earl Reibel (1930–2007), Canadian ice hockey player
- Grant Reibel (born 1980), Australian rugby league footballer
- Guy Reibel (born 1936), French composer

== See also ==
- Rebel (surname)
