= Oliver Cookson =

UK entrepreneur

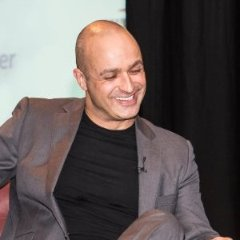
- Oliver Cookson in 2014
- Education: The Kingsway School, Stockport
- Occupation: Entrepreneur
- Known for: Founder of Myprotein

Oliver Cookson is an English entrepreneur who established the sports nutrition business Myprotein, which he sold in 2011 for £58 million to The Hut Group. He was named in the Sunday Times Rich List 2019 having recorded a net worth of £306 m.

== Early life ==
Oliver Cookson is a British entrepreneur, who grew up in Withington, Manchester, in the Northwest of England, and comes from a working-class background. After leaving school with one GCSE, he was taken on as an apprentice for an IT company before setting up on his own as a self-taught contract website developer for major global organisations.

== Career ==
Cookson, a keen weight trainer, launched sports nutrition brand Myprotein in 2004 with a £500 overdraft. He began trading from a lock-up garage and built Myprotein into a business employing more than fifty staff and selling products across the UK and Europe. The company manufactures and sells sports nutrition products and protein foods through its website. Products include protein powders, amino acids, vitamins, ready-to-drink products, omega oils and other weight loss and diet supplements.

In 2011, Cookson sold Myprotein to The Hut Group in a deal worth £58 million in cash plus shares in the group. Those shares earned him another estimated £283 million with The Hut Group's initial public offering (IPO) in 2020.

On 1 November 2011, Cookson established the business Monocore launching nutrition brands, including GoNutrition, before fully exiting the company in 2019. He then founded investment vehicle OSC Group according to Companies House.

In March 2017, Cookson took a major stake in online meat and health foods retailer LiveLean Nutrition. Cookson was appointed chair of the board, whilst maintaining his other director positions in GoNutrition, P-Fit and Monocore.

== Investments ==
In 2025, Cookson's family office partnered with property developer CERT to acquire the Grade II-listed Shena Simon Campus in Manchester for redevelopment into a hotel. The 97,000 sq ft building on Chorlton Street was purchased from The Manchester College following the relocation of teaching activities to a new nearby campus. The building originally opened in 1901 as the Central Higher Grade School and later served as a military hospital during the First World War before becoming a sixth-form college. The redevelopment forms part of wider regeneration in central Manchester. In September 2026, Cookson's family office announced plans to develop The Oliver, a £60 million hotel at the campus.

== Make-A-Wish (UK) ==
In November 2020, Cookson became a patron for the charity Make-A-Wish (UK). The charity had been severely impacted by the Covid-19 pandemic. Cookson donated £250,000.

== TV piracy ==
In 2001, Cookson was fined £600 and ordered to complete 200 hours community service after pleading guilty to selling devices that allowed viewers to see pay-per-view channels for free.

== Litigation ==
Cookson was involved in long running litigation with The Hut Group over the sale of Myprotein in 2011 and the valuations that each side had put on their business. Following a trial in The High Court in London in October 2014, Justice William Blair awarded Cookson net £6,482,911 million in relation to the counterclaim. The Hut Group had made the first move with what Blair called a "pre-emptive strike". Blair ordered that The Hut Group pay its own costs and meet one third of those incurred by Cookson and the Trust.

In 2019, Cookson brought High Court documents alleging new shares in The Hut Group were issued to investors without Cookson's approval after the co-sale rights were removed, reducing Cookson's shareholding from 11.6% to 8.3% between February 2016 and May 2018.
