= Marco Tutino =

Italian composer (born 1954)

Marco Tutino (born 30 May 1954) is an Italian composer. His emergence during the late 1970s was as the spearhead of an Italian Neo-Romantico group, founded with two other composers, Lorenzo Ferrero and Carlo Galante. He graduated from the Milan Conservatory, where he had studied flute and composition (with Giacomo Manzoni), in 1982.

He has composed operas, chamber music and symphonic works which have been performed by important Italian orchestras and concert societies. Some have been performed by music institutions in other countries, notably the BBC Philharmonic, The Berlin Radio Symphony Orchestra, Copenhagen Radio Symphony Orchestra, and The San Francisco Chamber Orchestra.

== Career ==
During the first part of his career, he showed a fixation with themes involving children. His first opera, performed in 1985 at the Genoa Opera, was a morbid, melancholic version of Pinocchio. In 1987, his second opera, Cyrano, was composed for an Opera Workshop in Alessandria (Piedmont, Italy). It was loosely based on Rostand's drama, and intended as a showcase for Laura Cherici, a soprano who would become his inspiration and long-time partner. In September 1990 he presented a new opera in Livorno, La Lupa, commissioned by Alberto Paloscia (to whom the opera was eventually dedicated) to further the cause of verismo on the 100th Anniversary of Mascagni's Cavalleria Rusticana. The most notable feature of the opera was the insertion of a recording of Italian pop singer Peppino di Capri, which caused quite a sensation.

At a later stage Tutino's works were conceived so as to deflate attention from their style; rather, they aimed at obtaining a politically correct and socially relevant consensus – as shown by his participation to the collective Requiem Mass for the Victims of the Mafia given in Palermo in March 1993, on the eve of judges Borsellino and Falcone's mafia killings, or by works like Song of Peace, and Vita ("Life") – a free operatic rendering of Mike Nichols's movie Wit, dealing with illness and death.

He has composed instrumental works as well, among which are the Sinfonietta for the Moscow-Montpellier Soloists (1994), Concerto for Clarinet and Orchestra (1995), and The Last Eagle, a flute concerto performed by the San Francisco Chamber Orchestra. Tutino has also composed a ballet, Richard III; a musical comedy, Il gatto con gli stivali (Puss in Boots); and a Kyrie and Agnus Dei for the Jubilaeum celebrations at the Vatican in August 2000, thereby disclosing a hitherto unknown religious commitment.

In the early 1990s Tutino decided to turn to the artistic directorships of Italian musical institutions. From 1991 to 1994 he programmed for the Pomeriggi Musicali chamber orchestra in Milan, afterwards was invited as composer-in-residence at Arena di Verona, then became artistic director of Teatro Regio di Torino, and since 2006, he is doubling as general and artistic manager of Teatro Comunale di Bologna.

Tutino's opera La ciociara, based on Alberto Moravia's novel depicting victims of the mass rapes in Ciociaria following the Battle of Monte Cassino, was given its premiere at San Francisco Opera on 13 June 2015. It received its European premiere at Teatro Lirico, Cagliari, on 24 November 2017.

== Works ==
- Pinocchio (Teatro Margherita Genova, 23 May 1985)
- Cirano (Teatro Comunale Alessandria, 18 September 1987)
- Vite immaginarie (Teatro Comunale di Bologna, 6 Novembre 1989)
- La lupa (Teatro La Gran Guardia of Livorno, 4 September 1990)
- Federico II (Commissioned by the Theater of Bonn 1992, premiered at Teatro Giovanni Battista Pergolesi di Jesi, 1º ottobre 2004)
- Il gatto con gli stivali (Teatro Filarmonico di Verona, 17 aprile 1997)
- Vita, opera in un atto Patrizia Valduga freely adapted from the comedy "Wit" by Margaret Edson (for Teatro alla Scala Milan in the Piccolo Teatro Studio, 9 May 2003 with Anna Caterina Antonacci)
- Le bel indifferent (Teatro Lauro Rossi Macerata, 15 July 2005, with Monica Bacelli, Luca Canonici, Elena Rossi, Milton Danilo Fernández; orchestra Státní opera Praha; dir: Guillaume Tourniaire; direction Pier Luigi Pizzi for Sferisterio di Macerata)
- The servant (Auditorium S. Paolo di Macerata, 27 luglio 2008) per la regia di Gabriele Lavia nell'ambito dello Sferisterio Opera Festival
- Senso, opera (Teatro Massimo Vittorio Emanuele di Palermo, 22 gennaio 2011)
- Le braci, opera in un atto, libretto by the composer from the novel Embers by Sándor Márai, commission by Festival della Valle d'Itria e Maggio Musicale Fiorentino National Theatre of Szeged for Armel International Opera Festival, Budapest, 9 ottobre 2014)
- La ciociara, in English as Two Women, after the Sophia Loren film La ciociara. San Francisco Opera, 19 June 2015, con Anna Caterina Antonacci)

== Selected recordings ==
- Le Braci (Embers)
