= Clacher =

Clacher is a surname of Scottish origin derived from the occupation of shoemaker. Notable people with the surname include:

- Angus Clacher (fl. early 21st century), a founder of I Want One of Those, online retailer
- John Clacher (fl. 1930s), Scottish professional association footballer
- Rachel Clacher (fl. early 21st century), a founder of Moneypenny Group
