= Embers (novel) =

1942 novel by Sándor Márai

- Cover of the 1942 edition
- Author: Sándor Márai
- Original title: A gyertyák csonkig égnek
- Translator: Carol Brown Janeway
- Cover artist: Sándor Fenyves
- Language: Hungarian
- Publisher: Révai, Alfred A. Knopf
- Publication date: 1942
- Publication place: Hungary
- English publication date: 25 September 2001
- Pages: 213
- ISBN: 978-0375407567

Embers is a 1942 novel by the Hungarian writer Sándor Márai. Its original Hungarian title, A gyertyák csonkig égnek, literally means “The Candles Burn Down to the Stump.” The novel centres on an elderly general who receives an old friend for dinner after a forty-one-year absence. As the night unfolds, their reunion gradually takes on the character of a courtroom trial, confronting events and secrets buried for decades. Long after its original publication in Hungarian and Márai's death, the novel became a major international success in the 1990s.

== Plot summary ==
The novel is set in 1940 in a grand old county house at the foot of the Carpathians, where Henrik, a retired general of the Austro-Hungarian Army, lives in almost complete seclusion. He receives a message announcing the return of Konrad, his closest childhood friend, whom he has not seen for forty-one years. The two men had met as boys at a military academy in Vienna and formed an intense friendship despite their very different backgrounds and temperaments. Henrik came from a wealthy Hungarian aristocratic family, while Konrad was the son of a civil servant in Galicia and his Polish wife; his family lived in modest circumstances. Sensitive and deeply drawn to music, Konrad possessed an artistic temperament that set him apart from the military world in which the two boys were raised. After leaving the academy, they remained inseparable, and Konrad became a frequent guest at Henrik's family estate.

After Henrik's marriage to Krisztina, Konrad remained a close friend of the couple. During a hunting expedition, Henrik suddenly senses that Konrad, standing behind him with his rifle, intends to shoot him, but the shot is never fired. Soon afterwards, Konrad abruptly disappears, abandoning his military career and eventually leaving Europe for the tropics. Only after his disappearance does Henrik discover that Krisztina had secretly visited Konrad's home, leading him to suspect that the two had been lovers. Although Henrik and Krisztina continue to live on the same estate, they become completely estranged and never discuss what has happened. Krisztina dies eight years later, leaving Henrik without the answers he seeks.

For more than four decades Henrik has preserved the memory of these events and waited for the possibility of confronting his former friend. When Konrad finally returns, the two elderly men sit down to dinner in the same room where they had last dined together. Henrik dominates their conversation, reconstructing their friendship and the events surrounding the hunting expedition in extraordinary detail. He questions Konrad about his intentions during the hunt and about the true nature of his relationship with Krisztina, seeking answers to the mysteries that have preoccupied him for so long. Konrad largely refuses to provide direct answers.

Henrik produces Krisztina's diary, which he has never read, and asks Konrad whether he wants to read it, as it might provide answers to questions that remain between them. When Konrad declines, Henrik throws the diary into the fire, deliberately destroying the last possible source of certainty. Their encounter ends without a definitive resolution of the conflict that has separated them. As the two men prepare to part for the last time, Henrik notices that the candles on the mantelpiece have burned down to their stumps over the course of the night.

After Konrad leaves, Henrik is met by Nini, his very old childhood nurse, and tells her that he feels calmer. Noticing the empty space where Krisztina's portrait once hung, he asks Nini to put the painting back, saying that its absence no longer matters. Nini makes the sign of the cross on his forehead, and they kiss each other good night.

== Major themes ==
The novel explores friendship, loyalty, and betrayal. At its centre is the relationship between Henrik and Konrad, whose intense youthful friendship endures despite — and in some ways because of — profound differences in temperament, social background, and their attitudes toward life. Over time, however, their relationship is undermined by tensions that remain largely unspoken. Their reunion after forty-one years becomes an attempt by Henrik to understand what really happened between them. Ultimately, the novel suggests that reconciliation or a full understanding of the past is less important than recognizing the enduring significance of those who have profoundly shaped one's life.

Another major theme is the possibility of knowing the truth. Henrik has spent decades reconstructing the events surrounding Konrad's departure and his relationship with Krisztina, yet the novel leaves his most important questions unanswered. His understanding of what happened is based on memory, inference, and his own interpretation of events, but it remains uncertain how closely this version of the past corresponds to reality. The novel thus raises the broader question of whether the truth can ever be fully known, or whether it may ultimately be a construction of our own.

The passage of time and the experience of ageing are also central. The world in which Henrik and Konrad were raised — that of the Austro-Hungarian monarchy, its aristocratic culture, and its codes of honour — has largely disappeared by the time of their final meeting. Their personal story is therefore also connected to the decline of a social order and milieu. Through Henrik, the novel explores what it means to grow old enough to outlive one's own era and the familiar world in which one's identity was formed, until one becomes a relic of that vanished world. The novel's Hungarian title, literally meaning "The Candles Burn Down to the Stump", reinforces this imagery of time and life gradually being consumed.

Solitude is another recurring theme. After his relationships with both Konrad and Krisztina collapse, Henrik withdraws into an increasingly isolated existence, preserving the world of his past almost unchanged around him. His decades of waiting for Konrad turn this solitude into a form of stasis: unable to leave the unresolved events of the past behind, he lets them come to define the remainder of his life. His obsession with the past thus becomes both a way of giving meaning to his existence and an obstacle to moving beyond it.

== Publication history ==
The novel was first published in serial form in the weekly magazine Új Idők, in thirteen instalments between 4 July and 26 September 1942. Its first book edition was published later that year by Révai as part of its Márai Sándor munkái (“Works of Sándor Márai”) series, with a dust jacket designed by Sándor Fenyves. It was reprinted several times in the following years. A separate edition was published in 1943 by the Székely Egyetemi és Főiskolai Hallgatók Egyesülete (SZEFHE; “Association of Székely University and College Students”) as part of its Magyar regények (“Hungarian Novels”) series. By 1946, Révai's editions had reached a cumulative print run of 27,000 copies. Following Márai’s emigration in 1948, his works ceased to be published in Hungary. A gyertyák csonkig égnek was not published again in the country until 1990, a year after Márai’s death, when it was included in the Márai Sándor művei (“Works of Sándor Márai”) series jointly issued by Akadémiai Kiadó and Helikon Kiadó. The novel's international success from 1998 onwards gave new impetus to Helikon's Márai series, which developed into a comprehensive edition of his works. It has since been regularly reissued in Hungary by this publisher.

The novel had an early international circulation in the years following World War II, appearing with established publishers in Spain, Germany and France. Its first foreign-language edition was the Spanish translation A la luz de los candelabros, translated and introduced by F. Oliver Brachfeld and published by Ediciones Destino in Barcelona in 1946; a second edition followed in 1951. A German translation by Eugen Görcz, Die Kerzen brennen ab, followed in 1950, published by Paul Neff in Berlin and Vienna, with a licensed reprint issued by the Viennese book club Buchgemeinschaft Donauland in 1954. In 1958, a French translation by Marcelle and Georges Régnier was published by Corrêa/Buchet-Chastel under the title Les Braises (“The Embers”). Despite these editions, the novel failed to attract lasting international attention and disappeared from foreign publishing until its rediscovery decades later. The title of the early French edition would later influence those adopted for several translations during the novel's international revival in the late 1990s.

After a gap of nearly four decades, the novel returned to international publishing in 1995, when Albin Michel reissued Marcelle and Georges Régnier's French translation under its original title, Les Braises. A new Italian translation by Marinella D'Alessandro, Le braci, was published by Adelphi in 1998, followed in 1999 by new Spanish and German translations: Judit Xantus's El último encuentro, published by Emecé in Barcelona, and Christina Viragh's Die Glut, published by Piper Verlag in Munich and Zürich. The success of the Italian edition was followed by translations into numerous other languages, and the novel became Márai's most widely translated work.

The first English-language edition, Embers, was published by Alfred A. Knopf in New York in 2001. Carol Brown Janeway's translation was unusual in being made not from the Hungarian original but from Christina Viragh's 1999 German translation, Die Glut, and remains the standard English translation. A British edition followed in 2002.

== Reception ==
Anna Shapiro reviewed the book for The Observer in 2002, and wrote: "Elegiac, sombre, musical, and gripping, Embers is a brilliant disquisition on friendship, one of the most ambitious in literature." Shapiro continued: "About a milieu and values that were already dying before the outbreak of World War II, it has the grandeur and sharpness of Jean Renoir's 1937 movie masterpiece La Grande Illusion, with which it shares, in both oblique and pronounced ways, some of its substance."

== Adaptations ==
- In 2006, Embers was adapted into a stage play by Christopher Hampton, starring Jeremy Irons and Patrick Malahide.
- Le braci (Italian for Embers) is a 2015 adaptation of the novel into an opera by Italian composer Marco Tutino.
- A film adaptation will be directed by István Szabó.

== See also ==
- 1942 in literature
- Hungarian literature
