= Want Button =

Business listings website

WANT Button
- Type: Private
- Traded as: Free
- Industry: Social Commerce
- Founded: 2010
- Founders: Alex Fenkell; Jordan Katzman
- Headquarters: Detroit, Michigan,
- Website: http://wantbutton.com

The Want Button is a social commerce service for online retailers that allows their shoppers to save and share coveted items to Facebook Timeline. The interface for viewing wants and the wants of others on Facebook is a duplicate of the original interface offered at wanttt.com. The Want Button aims to provide ecommerce companies with more exposure around their products and the ability to communicate with shoppers interested in buying their items.

== Retailers ==
The Want Button has over 5,000 sites using its service. This includes several of the largest online stores in the U.S. Some current stores with the Want Button include: Burlington Coat Factory, Frederick's of Hollywood, Tommy Bahama, The Sharper Image, Acer Computer, Jimmy Jazz, and DermStore.

== Service details ==
Each Want Button click on a merchant site posts that product's details (image, title, store name) back to the shopper's Facebook Timeline. On Facebook, the shopper can manage and organize their items using the Want Button app. Retailers can reach back out to shoppers who have clicked the Want Button directly in their Facebook notifications. Retailers give discounts, free shipping, and other offers in order to entice these shoppers to come back and buy.
