= Le braci =

2015 opera by Marco Tutino

Le braci ("Embers") is a 2015 Italian opera by Marco Tutino after the novel Embers by Sándor Márai.

== Recording ==
- Roberto Scandiuzzi (bass, Henrik), Pavol Kuban (tenor, Young Henrik), Davide Giusti (tenor, Young Konrad), Romina Tomasoni (mezzo-soprano, Nini), Alfonso Antoniozzi (bass, Konrad), Angela Nisi (soprano, Kristina) Orchestra Internazionale d’Italia, Francesco Cilluffo; Recorded July 2015 Palazzo Ducale, Martina Franca, Italy Dynamic 2CD
