= Coggles =

British designer clothing retailer

- Industry: Online shopping
- Founded: 1974; 52 years ago in York, England
- Founder: Victoria Bage
- Products: Designer clothing, accessories and homeware
- Owner: Frasers Group
- Website: coggles.com (Redirects to Flannels)

Coggles was a British designer clothing retailer. It was founded by Victoria Bage in 1974, bought out of administration by THG plc in 2013, and sold to Frasers Group in 2024.

== History ==
Coggles was founded in York in 1974 by Victoria Bage, who reportedly named the shop after her husband’s alleged mistress, Sarah Coggles, following a personal betrayal. Bage's son, Mark Bage, modernised the shop and launched an online store in 2006.

Coggles entered administration in 2013. The physical stores were liquidated and the online side business sold to the e-commerce retailer, The Hut Group.

In December 2017, after four years online-only, Coggles reopened a bricks-and-mortar flagship in Alderley Edge, Cheshire. The new 4,000 sq ft store occupied a former bank and featured marble interiors and former vaults repurposed as display rooms.

In June 2024, it was announced that THG plc had sold Coggles, along with the rest of THG's Luxury division, to Frasers Group.
