= The Rebel =

The Rebel may refer to:

== Journalism ==
- The Rebel (anarchist magazine), American anarchist magazine published 1895 to 1896
- Rebel News, a Canadian Internet and YouTube television channel founded by Ezra Levant

== Literature ==
- The Rebel (book), a 1951 book-length essay by Albert Camus
- "The Rebel" (poem), poem by Padraic Pearse
- The Rebel, novel by H. C. Bailey
- The Rebel (art magazine), British art magazine established in 1985

== Film ==
- The Rebel (1915 film), directed by J.E. Mathews and starring Allen Doone, from the play The Rebels by James B. Fagan
- The Rebel (1931 film), a French film directed by Adelqui Migliar
- The Rebel (1932 film), a German film directed by Edwin H. Knopf, Curtis Bernhardt and Luis Trenker
- The Rebel (1943 film), a Mexican film directed by Jaime Salvador
- The Rebel (1961 film), a film starring British comedian Tony Hancock
- The Rebel (1980 French film), a French film directed by Gérard Blain
- The Rebel (1980 Italian film), an Italian film starring Maurizio Merli
- The Rebel (1993 film), an Italian film starring Penélope Cruz, known in Italian as La ribelle
- The Rebel (2007 film), a Vietnamese film starring Johnny Nguyen

== Music ==
- The Rebel, the moniker under which Ben Wallers of Country Teasers records and performs solo
- "The Rebel", a song recorded by Johnny Cash in the late 1950s, theme music for the TV Western of the same name
- "The Rebel", Hard Trance single by Yves Deruyter, released in 1997, making his international breakthrough

== Television ==
- The Rebel (American TV series), an American western television series
- The Rebel (British TV series), a 2016 British sitcom
- The Rebel (South Korean TV series), a 2017 series
- The Rebel (Chinese TV series), a 2021 Chinese historical thriller television series

== Theater ==
- The Rebel (1964 play), directed by Patrick Garland

== See also ==
- Rebel (disambiguation)
- The Rebels (disambiguation)
- Bidrohi
