= Myprotein =

British online sports nutrition retailer

- Product type: Bodybuilding supplements, athleisure
- Current owner: THG plc
- Country: United Kingdom
- Introduced: 2004
- Related brands: Myvitamins; Myvegan; MP Activewear
- Markets: Worldwide
- Website: myprotein.com

Myprotein is a British bodybuilding supplement brand which has developed into a family of brands, including Myvitamins, Myvegan and MP Activewear. It was founded in 2004 by Oliver Cookson and bought by The Hut Group in 2011.

== History ==
Myprotein was founded in 2004 by Oliver Cookson and acquired by British e-commerce company, The Hut Group, in June 2011.

In December 2015, Myprotein announced an agreement with Kentucky Cabinet for Economic Development to build their first production facility outside the UK in Bullitt County, Kentucky. Myprotein (registered as Cend Limited) invested $17 million to rent a production and distribution facility that planned to create 350 new jobs in the region.

== Controversies ==
In 2014, The Hut Group sued Oliver Cookson for £15 million, alleging that he and his off-shore trust had overstated the profits of Myprotein prior to its acquisition by The Hut Group in 2011. Cookson counter sued for £12.7 million claiming a breach of warranty and fraudulent misrepresentation. The matter went to the High Court in London in October 2014 and, after a month-long trial, judgement was given by William Blair in November 2014 awarding Cookson an overall net result win of £6.5m in damages.

At the costs hearing in December 2014, the judge awarded a payment of just under £7.5 million to be made by The Hut Group to Cookson and the Trust in respect of all of the claims and counterclaims in the action and one third of the costs incurred by Cookson and the Trust.

Cookson and the Trust appealed the court's decision to award The Hut Groups damages. The court of appeal dismissed the appeal on 22 March 2016.
