= Rebel Dean =

British actor, singer, songwriter, entertainer, and musician

- Born: 11 April 1966 (age 59)
- Origin: UK
- Genres
- Occupations: Singer, songwriter, actor
- Years active: 1988–present
- Labels: Foottapping Records
- Website: rebeldean.com

Rebel Richard Dean (born 11 April 1966) is a British actor, singer, songwriter, entertainer, and musician. He is known for his acting and singing roles in Joseph, Casualty, Only Fools and Horses, and Hollyoaks.

== Biography ==
Dean was given a guitar at the age of 10 and started performing in school plays. By the age of fifteen he played the lead male in his first theatre role, Pharaoh in Joseph and the Amazing Technicolor Dreamcoat. After leaving school, he drove a Ford pick-up truck during the day and played the pubs and clubs at night. He has played many roles in theater, film and TV productions including Hollyoaks, Only Fools and Horses, Casualty, This Life, The Vet (HTV), Prince and the Pauper, Inspector Wycliffe (HTV). Other films he has played the male lead in include Ebb Tide and California Eden.

Dean starred in the stage show 4 Steps to Heaven for the latter part of 1998 and most of 1999 playing the young, middle and mature Elvis Presley. He has co-written the anthem for the Cornish county rugby team Trelawney's Army.

== Film ==
Year	Title	Credited as				Notes	Ref(s)
Year	Title	Actor	Producer	Writer	Role	Notes	Ref(s)
2021	THE GILDED CAGE	Yes	No	No	Detective Morgan	Male lead	
2021	ORPHANS	Yes	No	No	Danny	Male lead	
2021	MIRROR IMAGE	Yes	No	No	Matt Manning	Male lead	
2016	BLOOD RUNS THICK	Yes	No	No	Big Billy	Male lead	
2014	FIVE CARD DRAW	Yes	No	No	Zed	Male lead	
2013	SCOOP	Yes	No	No	George Turner	Male lead	
2013	CALIFORNIA EDEN	Yes	No	No	Rev. Jim Jones	Male lead	
2012	BREAKING POINT	Yes	No	No	Robson	2nd Male lead	
2012	DISMISSED	Yes	No	No	Master Friedman	Male lead	
2012	FREE RADICALS	Yes	No	No	Luc	2nd Male lead	
2011	DISCLOSURE	Yes	No	No	Nick Jones	Male lead	
2011	GETAWAY	Yes	No	No	Ollie	Male lead	
2011	SHE BE MY DEVIL	Yes	No	No	Detective Brett	2nd Male lead	
2011	THE FANTASTIC ADVENTURES OF HENRY HAWKE	Yes	No	No	Henry Hawke	Male lead	
2010	ACTION BOY	Yes	No	No	Hindley	Male lead	
2010	CHARLOTTE AND ANNE	Yes	No	No	Dad	Male lead	
2010	HITTING THE BOTTLE	Yes	No	No	Tramp	Male lead	
2010	TEMPUS FUGIT	Yes	No	No	Max	Male lead	
2010	THE HAUNTED	Yes	No	No	Dave	Male lead	
2010	THE SUNNY SIDE OF TOWN	Yes	No	No	Jack	Male lead	
2010	THE WISP	Yes	No	No	Dad	Male lead	
2010	TIME TRAVELLER	Yes	No	No	Dad	Male lead	
2010	WEST COUNTRY	Yes	No	No	Ray	Male lead	
1998	EBB TIDE	Yes	No	No	Joe	Male lead	
1998	SUPERDOC	Yes	No	No	Doctor	Male lead	

== Commercial/ Documentary ==
Year	Title	Credited as				Notes	Ref(s)
Year	Title	Actor	Producer	Writer	Role	Notes	Ref(s)
2021	THE EDDIE COCHRAN FESTIVAL – LOST PERFORMANCES	Yes	No	No	Eddie Cochran	Male lelad	
1995	BRITISH TELECOM	Yes	No	No	Cool 50's guy		
1995	KIT KAT	Yes	No	No	Record Company Executive	Male lelad	

== Musical/ Voiceover/ Pantomime ==
Year	Title	Credited as				Notes	Ref(s)
Year	Title	Actor	Producer	Writer	Role	Notes	Ref(s)
2021	GUITAR BREAKS	Yes	No	No	Elvis	Male lead	
2017	WHOLE LOTTA SHAKIN' (UK TOUR 2015–PRESENT)	Yes	No	No	Shaky	Male lead	
2016	ROCK N ROLL PARADISE	Yes	No	No	Eddie Cochran /Elvis	Male lead	
2015	THAT'LL BE THE DAY (U.K. & EUROPEAN TOUR)(2006–2015)	Yes	No	No	Variety Star	Male lead	
2004	ROCKIN' ON HEAVENS DOOR -UK, MIDDLE EAST & EUROPE INC. LONDON PALLADIUM (2000 -2006))	Yes	No	No	Eddie Cochran	Male lead	
2000	ELVIS THE MUSICAL	Yes	No	No	Elvis	Male lead	
1999	FOUR STEPS TO HEAVEN	Yes	No	No	Elvis	Male lead	
1990	ANNIE GET YOUR GUN	Yes	No	No	Tommy Keeler	Male lead	
1990	DICK WHITTINGTON	Yes	No	No	The Sultan	Male lead	
1988	CINDERELLA	Yes	No	No	Copa Cabana Sid	Male lead	
1987	GREASE	Yes	No	No	The Teen Angel	Male lead	
1982	JOSEPH AND THE AMAZING TECHNICOLOR DREAMCOAT	Yes	No	No	The Pharoah	Male lead	

== Discography ==
Dean has released a number of singles and albums so far in his music career.

=== Albums ===
S. No.	Name	Record label	Year released	Notes
1	Life in the Fast Lane (CD, Album)	Gold Star Records	2002	Male lead
2	Live in Paris '93 (CD, Album)	Gold Star Records	2003	Male lead
3	Rebellion (CD, Album)	Foot Tapping Records	2013	Male lead
4	Rock 'N' Roll Gypsy (CD, Album)	Foot Tapping Records	2015	Male lead
5	Whole Lotta Shakin' (A Tribute To Shakin' Stevens) (CD, Album)	Foot Tapping Records	2017	Male lead

=== Singles ===
S. No.	Name	Record label	Year released
1	"Let's Cut Loose" (7", Ltd, Pic)	Foot Tapping Records	2013

Other notable music contributions include That'll Be The Day portraying legends from Elvis Presley to Freddie Mercury.
