= Rebel (given name) =

Rebel is a unisex given name. Notable people with the name include:

== Men ==
- Rebel A. Cole (born 1958), American professor
- Rebel Dean (born 1966), British actor and musician
- Rebel Oakes (1883–1948), American baseball player
- Reb Porter, American public address (PA) announcer
- Rebel Rodriguez (born 1999), American actor and son of director Robert Rodriguez
- Rebel Steiner (1927–2014), defensive back in the National Football League

== Women ==
- Rebel Morrow (born 1977), Australian Olympic eventing rider
- Rebel Penfold-Russell, Australian film producer and occasional actress
- Rebel Randall (1922–2010), American film actress and radio personality
- Rebel Wilson (born 1980), Australian actress, writer, and stand-up comedian

== Fiction ==
- Rebel Rouge, the New Yoke City counterpart of Rouge from Sonic Prime

== See also ==
- Rebel (surname)
