= On the Rebound (disambiguation) =

On the Rebound is an idiom commonly used to describe recovering from a setback, specifically after being romantically rejected by another. It may also refer to:

- On the Rebound, a 1961 album by Floyd Cramer
  - "On the Rebound", a song from the album
- "On the Rebound", a 1980 song by Russ Ballard covered by Uriah Heep as single from the 1982 album Abominog
- "On the Rebound", a 1989 duet written by Ian Levine and Fiachra Trench for Brenda Holloway and Jimmy Ruffin

== See also ==
- Rebound (disambiguation)
