= Preloved =

British classified advertising website

- Website type: Classified advertising
- Available in: English
- Founded: 1998; 28 years ago
- Headquarters: Manchester Airport, Manchester, {{{location_country}}}
- Owner: THG Ingenuity
- Founder: Ian Buzer
- Website: preloved.co.uk
- Users: 10M+

Preloved.co.uk is a classified advertising website based in the UK. It was founded by Ian Buzer in 1998 and bought by The Hut Group in 2014. In January 2025, THG plc demerged its technology and logistics arm, THG Ingenuity, into a privately owned, stand-alone business.

== History ==
Preloved was founded by Ian Buzer in 1998. Initially for second-hand and vintage items, it became of the largest sites for advertising pets, horses and livestock. In 2012, it was ranked 2nd in the UK for classified ads by Hitwise. In 2013, it recorded over 1.1 billion page views on its advert pages. As of 2014, Preloved was the largest independent classified ads site in the UK.

In March 2014, Moo Ltd, the owner of Preloved.co.uk, was bought by The Hut Group.

In July 2015, Preloved launched its first ever mobile app for iOS focused on Apple's iPhone market. An Android version was launched on 3 November 2015.

== Business model ==
Preloved has no listing or selling fees. But users can pay to get their advertisements more exposure. It has over 10 million members and hundreds of thousands of adverts in over 500 categories.

Advertisements which have been created in the last twelve days are initially reserved only for upgraded buyers but they become available to all after the twelve days. For business sellers, Preloved requires users to maintain a monthly business membership.
