= The Rebels =

The Rebels may refer to:

== Novels ==
- The Rebels (Sándor Márai novel) (Hungarian title: A zendülők), a 1930 novel by Sándor Márai
- The Rebels (John Jakes novel), a 1975 historical novel by John Jakes

== Film and TV ==
- The Rebels, an American comedy-drama pilot on Amazon Studios
- The Rebels (TV series), a 1976 American television series
- The Rebels (1972 film), also known as Quelques arpents de neige, a Canadian drama film by Denis Héroux
- The Rebels (1979 film), a 1979 American television film based on the Jakes novel
- The Rebel Alliance, fictional military alliance from Star Wars

== Music ==
- Duane Eddy and the Rebels, an American rock and roll band
- The Rebels (rockabilly band), an American rockabilly band
- The Rebels (surf band), an American surf music band
- The Rebels (Prince band), backing band of American musician Prince that evolved into The Revolution
- "The Rebels", a 1996 song by The Cranberries from To the Faithful Departed
- The Rebels, the continuation of New Zealand band Larry's Rebels after Larry's departure

== See also ==
- The Rebel (disambiguation)
- Rebel (disambiguation)
