= THG Fluently =

British language translation service

- Formerly: Language Connect
- Founded: September 2003; 22 years ago in London, England
- Founders: Ben and Iwona Taylor
- Area served: Worldwide
- Services: Translation; Language localisation
- Owner: THG Ingenuity
- Website: thgfluently.com

THG Fluently, formerly Language Connect, is a translation and language localisation service provided by THG Ingenuity. It provides a range of language services, including translation, interpreting, localisation, voice-overs, transcription, and multilingual search engine optimization.

== History ==
The company was founded by Ben and Iwona Taylor as Language Connect in 2003 and targeted translation services to multinational companies. Based in London, it opened its first international operations in Munich in 2009 with subsequent branches opening in Melbourne (2009), New York City (2012), Istanbul (2012) and Singapore (2015).

In 2018, the company was acquired by THG plc for £12.7m. It was rebranded as THG Fluently and formed the translation service for THG Ingenuity, an e-commerce platform. In January 2025, THG plc demerged its technology and logistics arm, THG Ingenuity, into a privately owned, stand-alone business.
