= Cult Beauty =

Online beauty retailer

- Website type: Online shopping
- Founded: 2008
- Headquarters: Manchester Airport, Manchester, United Kingdom
- Owner: THG plc
- Founders: Alexia Inge and Jessica DeLuca
- Products: Cosmetics
- Parent: THG Beauty
- Website: cultbeauty.co.uk

Cult Beauty is a web store which sells cosmetics and specialises in independent brands. It was acquired by THG plc for £291.3m in 2021 and migrated into the company's Ingenuity e-commerce platform.

== History ==
Cult Beauty was established in 2007 by Jessica DeLuca and Alexia Inge with the aim to simplify hair and beauty retail online. The brand had a focus on sustainable beauty and transparency within the industry. DeLuca came up with the idea while shopping for beauty products. Inge reportedly became frustrated while working as a model by the "illusion" of brands not being accurately represented in celebrity makeup endorsements. The website offered a curated list of around 250 products based on a panel of unaffiliated experts’ recommendations.

In 2011, the brand received the first round of investment from Murray Salmon, former Chief Financial Officer of Net-a-Porter and Mark Quinn-Newall, a co-founder of Net-a-Porter. Carmen Busquets was appointed chair of the board in October 2020.

Although based in the UK, most of the Cult Beauty's business was from international sources. The company recorded sales growth to £123.4 million in 2020, citing the surge in online shopping during the COVID-19 pandemic.

In August 2021, Cult Beauty was acquired by THG plc in a £275 million deal.
