= I Want One of Those =

IWOOT
- Website type: Online shopping
- Founded: 2000; 26 years ago
- Headquarters: United Kingdom
- Founders: Tim Booth, Angus Clacher and Mike Morrison
- Products: Gadgets, toys, clothing and homeware
- Website: iwantoneofthose.com

I Want One of Those (also referred to as IWOOT) is an online retailer of gadgets, toys, clothing and homeware. It was acquired by THG plc from Findel Group in 2010. In July 2023, THG confirmed the sale of its OnDemand division to its existing leadership team, with financial backing from investment firm Gordon Brothers.

== History ==
The company was founded in January 2000 by Tim Booth, Angus Clacher and Mike Morrison with an initial investment of £15,000.

In October 2004, Kleeneze plc acquired IWOOT for £6.0 million in cash to be paid over a three-year period plus performance related deferred consideration of up to £4.65 million, payable over three years.

In August 2010, I Want One of Those and the wedding planning website Confetti were sold by Findel plc to The Hut Group for £600,000.

In July 2023, THG confirmed the sale of the OnDemand division, including IWOOT, to its existing leadership team as ZavviGroup Ltd, with financial backing from investment firm Gordon Brothers.

On October 12th 2026, the website and its holding company ZavviGroup entered administration, with the website displaying a "coming soon" message, however no buyer has been found.
