= Casanova in Bolzano =

1940 novel by Sándor Márai

- Author: Sándor Márai
- Language: Hungarian
- Genre: Historical fiction
- Published: 1940
- Publication place: Hungary
- Pages: 294

Casanova in Bolzano is a 1940 novel by Sándor Márai. The book begins with Casanova's escape from Piombi, from which he heads into the Alps, to Bolzano. It is here that he re-encounters an enemy from the past, the Duke of Parma, and again contests with him over a woman named Francesca. The book was published in Hungary in 1940 and published in an English translation in 2004.
