= Reb =

Reb or REB may refer to:

== Common meanings ==
- Johnny Reb, personification of a Confederate soldier in the American Civil War
- Reb (Yiddish), an honorific title for a teacher

== People ==
- Reb Anderson (born 1943), American Zen Buddhist teacher and writer
- Reb Beach (born 1963), American rock guitarist
- Reb Brown (born 1948), American actor
- Reb Russell (1889-1975), American Major League Baseball pitcher
- Reb Spikes (1888-1982), American jazz saxophonist and entrepreneur
- Lafayette Russell, American football player and actor
- REB, web handle of Columbine massacre shooter Eric Harris

== Food chemistry ==
- Rebaudioside compounds from the stevia plant, used as sweeteners

== REB ==
- Relativistic electron beam, streams of electrons moving at relativistic speeds
- Revised English Bible, a 1989 English language translation of the Bible
- Research ethics board, or institutional review board, type of committee that applies research ethics
- Rural Electrification Board, in Bangladesh - see Electricity distribution companies by country
- Rwanda Education Board, in Rwanda it is a part of the ministry of education(MINEDUC Rwanda) in charge of general education as the Workforce Development (WDA) is in charge of vocational schools

== Other uses ==
- Reb River, Ethiopia

== See also ==
- Rebound (disambiguation)
