= Catherine Lara =

French musician (born 1945)

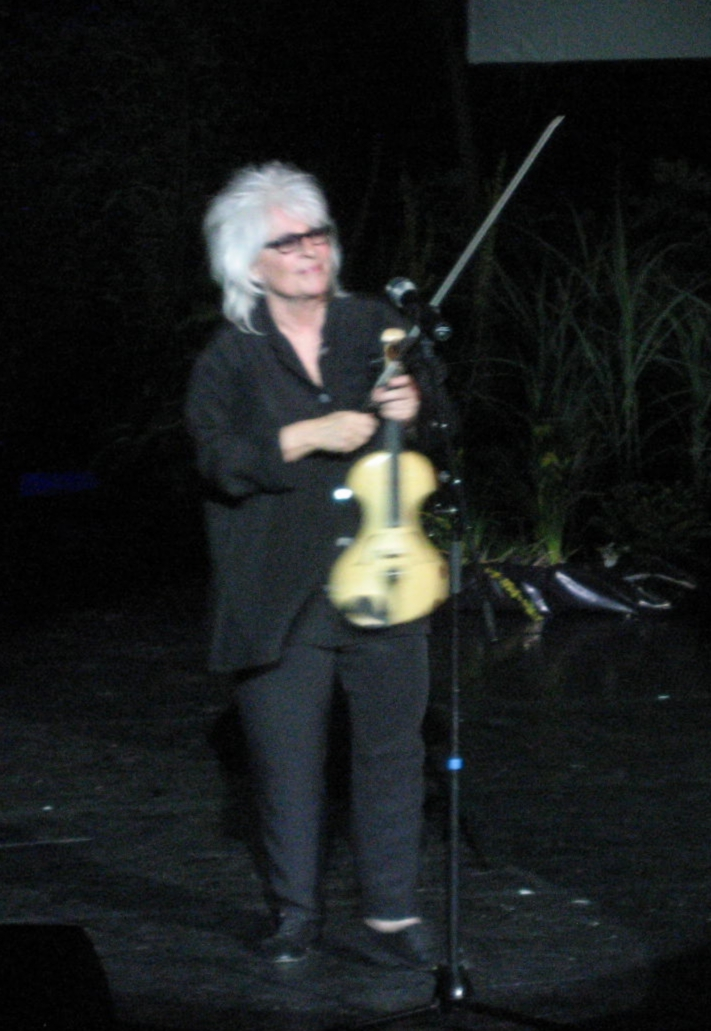
- Lara in 2009

Background information
- Born: Catherine Bodet; 29 May 1945 (age 81)
- Origin: Poissy, France
- Genres: Rock; French pop; pop rock
- Occupations: Singer; songwriter; violinist; composer
- Instruments: Violin; electric violin; vocals
- Years active: 1972–present
- Labels: Discos CBS; Columbia; CBS Masterworks; Sony Music Classics; Trema; Polygram; Philips; Phonogram; Philips Classics; Universal; Mercury
- Website: lara-passion.fr

Catherine Lara (French pronunciation: [katʁin laʁa]; born Catherine Bodet; 29 May 1945) is a French violinist, composer, singer, and author. Over a career spanning more than five decades, she has established herself as an icon in French pop/rock music as well as the neo-classical genre. She has released 26 studio albums, contributed music to numerous television and film productions, and helped stage and produce many theatrical works. Lara is openly lesbian.

== Career ==
=== Beginnings ===
Catherine Bodet was born in Poissy, near Paris, the daughter of a doctor and pianist father, and a violinist mother. Catherine started playing the violin at age 5 and entered the Conservatoire de Versailles at age 11, obtaining first prize in 1958. She went on to get the 2nd prize for violin at the Conservatoire de Paris in 1965 and the first prize for chamber music in 1966.

Leaving the Conservatoire, Lara started her own chamber orchestra, Les Musiciens de Paris, in which she played first violin. She then created the Lara Quartet, which accompanied singers on stage, including Claude Nougaro, Nana Mouskouri, Mireille Mathieu, and Jean Ferrat. She played on recordings by Françoise Hardy, Maxime Le Forestier, Georgette Lemaire, Jean Sablon, and Juliette Gréco, as well as writing two songs for Barbara's 1972 album Amours incestueuses. In 1969, Lara opened for Canadian musician Gilles Vigneault at the Olympia music hall in Paris.

Lara's first original album, Ad libitum, was released in 1972, and in 1975 she composed the score to the French film Docteur Françoise Gailland. In 1977, William Sheller dedicated a song to her on his album Symphoman, and she played violin on the recording. In 1979, she contributed to the album Contes de traviole by Richard Gotainer. Lara's 1974 folk-tinged album La craie dans l'encrier included vocal contributions from Gilbert Montagné.

=== Rock era ===
Since her 1979 album Coup d'feel, Lara's songs have been more influenced by rock music. This album, recorded in the town of Morin-Heights in Quebec, also saw the beginning of Lara's collaboration with French-Canadian lyricist Luc Plamondon. Jean-Pierre Ferland also contributed to the album. In the early 80s she wrote scores for several films such as The Rebel (1980), Men Prefer Fat Girls (1981), and La Triche (1984), and she wrote the music for the musical show Revue et corrigée, created by her friends Bob Decout and Annie Girardot in 1982.

The 1983 album La Rockeuse de diamant proved a major success, with the eponymous single and the daring song "Autonome", in which Lara openly reveals her sexual preferences with the words "...for a long time I thought what others thought, ...I lived as if I was someone else...for a long time I knew parallel loves...until the day when, autonomous, autonomous, free to love a woman or a man...". This made Lara one of the first French celebrities to come out as openly gay. During an interview with Michel Denisot on the show Mon Zénith à moi, when asked what she looks for first in a man, she stated "His wife". Although she did not publicize it at the time, Lara dated actress Muriel Robin from 1990 to 1995.

=== Breakthrough ===
In 1986, Lara had a breakthrough with the single "Nuit magique", written by Luc Plamondon, from the album of the same name. Her biggest hit to date, it brought her fame and helped her win a Victoires de la Musique (French Grammy Award) for best female singer of the year; the music video for the song won the Caméra d'Or award at Cannes. The album was entirely composed and arranged in collaboration with the young Chilean-Swiss pianist Sebastian Santa Maria, with whom she worked again on two of her consecutive records, Encore une fois (1987) and Rocktambule (1988).

In 1987, Lara published her autobiography, titled L'Aventurière de l'archet perdu (The adventurer of the lost bow).

Her 1988 album Rocktambule witnessed another collaboration with Santa Maria, as well as a duet with Bernard Lavilliers. On the song "I.E.O.", she paid tribute to the late French musician Daniel Balavoine. Lara wrapped up a successful decade with a two-week series of concerts at the Olympia that year, which was recorded and released as Lara Live 88.

=== 1990s: new projects, national honour ===
In 1990, Lara was named Chevalier de l'Ordre des Arts et des Lettres by the French Ministry of Culture.

In 1991, she worked with Plamondon on a rock opera where she embodied female writer George Sand, titled Sand et les Romantiques. As part of the show, she released a duet with her friend Véronique Sanson, entitled "Entre elle et moi". Other artists involved in the production include Riccardo Cocciante, Daniel Lavoie, and Maurane. The opera was staged by Alfredo Arias at the Théâtre du Châtelet in Paris.

1993 proved to be a busy year for Lara. She took part in several charity concerts for Les Restos du coeur alongside French rock stars Johnny Hallyday, Eddy Mitchell, and Jean-Jacques Goldman, as well as supporting Sidaction and Sol En Si. Later that year, she released the album Maldonne. She also acted as artistic advisor for the Roger Louret production La Java des mémoires.

1996 saw the release of the album Mélomanie, 10 songs written together with Jean-Jacques Thibaud, with musical input from Sylvain Luc, who had previously played on a number of Lara's recordings. The album release was followed by a notable performance at the Printemps de Bourges festival, as well as three evenings at the Olympia. The same year, Lara also wrote music for the television series Terre indigo.

With Roger Louret writing lyrics, Lara arranged Georges Bizet's opera L'Arlésienne, which was performed at the Folies Bergère in Paris in 1997, with Bernadette Lafont and Jean Marais as leads.

=== 2000s–present ===
In 2000, Lara released a major musical work titled Aral, her name spelled backwards, made up entirely of instrumental compositions, with contributions from the French world music project Deep Forest.

In 2002, she cowrote the official song for the France national football team, titled "Tous Ensemble", to be sung by Johnny Hallyday. The same year, she was named Officier de l'Ordre de la Légion d'honneur.

In 2005, Lara composed the musical show Graal, inspired by Arthurian lore, which was certified Gold. She also released an album of original songs titled Passe-moi l'ciel the same year.

2006 saw two collaborations, one with French singer Isabelle Aubret on the song "Le dernier aveu" and three tracks on Mario Pelchat's album Le monde où je vais.

In 2009, Lara released her next instrumental album, titled Au-delà des murs, whose music was inspired by the sound of the Balkans. The CD was accompanied by a DVD, the performances on which were co-directed by Éric Mouquet of Deep Forest.

In February 2011, Lara published her second book, Entre émoi et moi, and followed this with the album Une voix pour ferré (A voice for Ferré), in honour of the Monégasque poet and composer Léo Ferré. She also co-hosted the French selection for the Eurovision Song Contest 2011, together with Laurent Boyer.

Paying homage to her own repertoire, in 2012 Lara released the album Au cœur de l'âme Yiddish. A re-recording of some of her best-known songs such as "Nuit Magique" with a distinctly Yiddish flavour, she is accompanied on the album by the klezmer ensemble Sirba Octet. The song "Le dos au mur" is a duet with Mathilde Seigner.

In 2014–2015, Lara wrote the score to the French crime drama series Capitaine Marleau, directed by her friend Josée Dayan.

Lara's next, and to date latest, original album was released in 2018 and titled Bô, le voyage musical. This was accompanied by a theatrical production held at the Théâtre du 13e Art in Paris.

== Discography ==
=== Studio albums ===
- Ad libitum (fr) (1972)
- Les années poussière (1972)
- Marche dans le temps (1972)
- La craie dans l'encrier (1974)
- Nil (1975)
- Jeux de société (1976)
- Vaguement (1977)
- Coup d'feel (fr) (1979)
- Geronimo (1980)
- Johan (fr) (1981)
- T'es pas drôle (1982)
- La Rockeuse de diamants (fr) (1983)
- Flamenrock/Espionne (1984)
- Nuit magique (fr) (1986)
- Encore une fois (1987)
- Rocktambule (1988)
- Sand et les romantiques (1991)
- Maldonne (1993)
- Mélomanie (1996)
- Aral (fr) (Instrumental) (2000)
- Graal (fr) (2005)
- Passe-moi l'ciel (2005)
- Au-delà des murs (Instrumental) (2009)
- Une voix pour ferré (2011)
- Au cœur de l'âme Yiddish (with Sirba Octet and Mathilde Seigner) (2012)
- Bô, le voyage musical (Instrumental) (2018)

=== Live albums ===
- Catherine Lara en concert à l'Olympia (1984)
- Lara Live 88 (1988)

=== Best of ===
- 16 grands succès (1984)
- 1 Heure avec Catherine Lara (1984)
- Plein Feux (1985)
- The Best of Magic Lara - 12 hits (1986)
- Bravo à Catherine Lara (1988)
- Rock'n roll de Montréal (72–80) – double CD (1992)
- Sonate pour guitare et violon (1992)
- La craie dans l’encrier (1992)
- Coup de feel (1992)
- 16 chansons d’or (1993)
- Collection Gold - Au milieu de nulle part (1995)
- Collection Gold - Coup de feel(1995)
- Best of Lara (72–96 Les années magiques) – double CD (1997)
- Best of Lara (72–96 Les années magiques) – box set of 5 CDs (1997)
- Coup d’feel (2001)
- Les indispensables - versions originales (2003)
- Master Série (2003)
- Le best of (2005)
- Catherine Lara (2005)
- Les années CBS – box set of 8 CDs (2015)
- 4 albums originaux – box set of 4 CDs (2015)
- Best Hits – box set of 3 CDs (2016)

=== Collaborations ===
- Sol En Si with Alain Souchon, Francis Cabrel, Maurane, Maxime Le Forestier, Michel Jonasz (1993)

=== Scores ===
- Docteur Françoise Gailland (1976)
- The Rebel (1980)
- Men Prefer Fat Girls (1981)
- Revue et corrigée (1982)
- La Triche (1984)
- Terre indigo (1996) / TV Series
- Capitaine Marleau (2015) / TV Series

== Bibliography ==
- L'Aventurière de l'archet perdu (1987)
- Entre émoi et moi (2011)

== Related Francophone artists ==
- Barbara
- William Sheller
- Françoise Hardy
- Luc Plamondon
- Véronique Sanson
- Johnny Hallyday
- Deep Forest
