= Make-A-Wish Foundation UK =

Charity founded in 1986

Make-A-Wish Foundation UK ("Make-A-Wish UK") is a UK-based charity founded in 1986. The charity grants wishes to children and young people fighting life-threatening conditions, and is affiliated to Make-A-Wish Foundation International.

== History ==
Make-A-Wish UK was founded in 1986, inspired by the story of Chris Greicius – a young boy fighting leukaemia in America. The first wish to be granted in the UK was for Anthony in Liverpool, who wished to meet Disney characters at Disney World in Florida. After four years, the charity had granted 100 wishes.

Make-A-Wish UK granted its 10,000th wish in 2015, to a boy called Ben – who wished to be a chef for the day after he was diagnosed with leukaemia when he was 5 years old. In June 2019, Make-A-Wish UK has now granted over 13,000 wishes.

== Wishes ==
A wish is a special experience for a child or young person fighting a life-threatening condition. Wishes can range from being a princess or being a business owner for the day or meeting a hero, to going on a once-in-a-lifetime family holiday.

To receive a wish, a child must be between the ages of 3 and 17 years, living in the UK, and fighting a life-threatening condition. Make-A-Wish UK contacts each child's medical consultant to establish medical eligibility.

Make-A-Wish UK surveys the families of children who have received wishes, to evaluate the impact that wishes have on wish children and their families. In the charity's 2014 survey:

- 91% of respondents said that the wish gave their family a greater sense of closeness.
- 87% said the wish added to the child's quality of life.
- 39% reported that the wish reduced the child's suffering from physical symptoms.

== Celebrity supporters ==
Make-A-Wish UK has a number of celebrity supporters, who back the charity through helping grant wishes and supporting fundraising initiatives. Make-A-Wish UK's celebrity supporters are, Alec Stewart, Alex Walkinshaw, Amanda Holden, Amy Childs, Angela Griffin, Ben Barnes, Ben Fogle, Bradley Walsh, Brian Turner, Dani Harmer, Duncan Bannatyne, Florence Welch, Hayley Tamaddon, Ian Kelsey, Jeff Stelling, Jenna Randall, Jenson Button, John Terry, Jude Law, Justin Fletcher, Kate Garraway, Katy Ashworth, Keith Chegwin, Olivia Hallinan, Sir Paul McCartney, Robert Powell, Samantha Barks, Samuel Eto'o, Scott Quinnell, and Warwick Davis

In 2014, John Terry and Warwick Davis took part in the BGC Charity Day to raise money for Make-A-Wish UK.

== Corporate supporters ==
Make-A-Wish UK works with a number of companies across the UK. Notable supporters include Fairy (P&G), Flight Centre, Angel Springs, That'll Be The Day, and Harvester.

Fairy have been working with Make-A-Wish UK for eleven years, and have donated £1 million over this period. In 2013 Fairy ran a TV advert in support of Make-A-Wish UK, featuring Hollywood actor Sean Bean.

== Management ==
Make-A-Wish UK's Chief Executive is Jason Suckley, who joined in April 2015. Jason's predecessor Neil Jones had been at the charity for 10 years. The charity's Chair is Per Harkjaer, who succeeded David Maloney in February 2015. The board of trustees is additionally formed of Pippa Carte, John Orriss, Graham Stapleton, Susan Gent, Tim Cook, Ian Lathey, David Hockley, Jim Cook and Zafar Khan.

== See also ==
- Make-A-Wish Foundation
