= Teatro La Gran Guardia =

Former theatre and cinema in Livorno, Italy

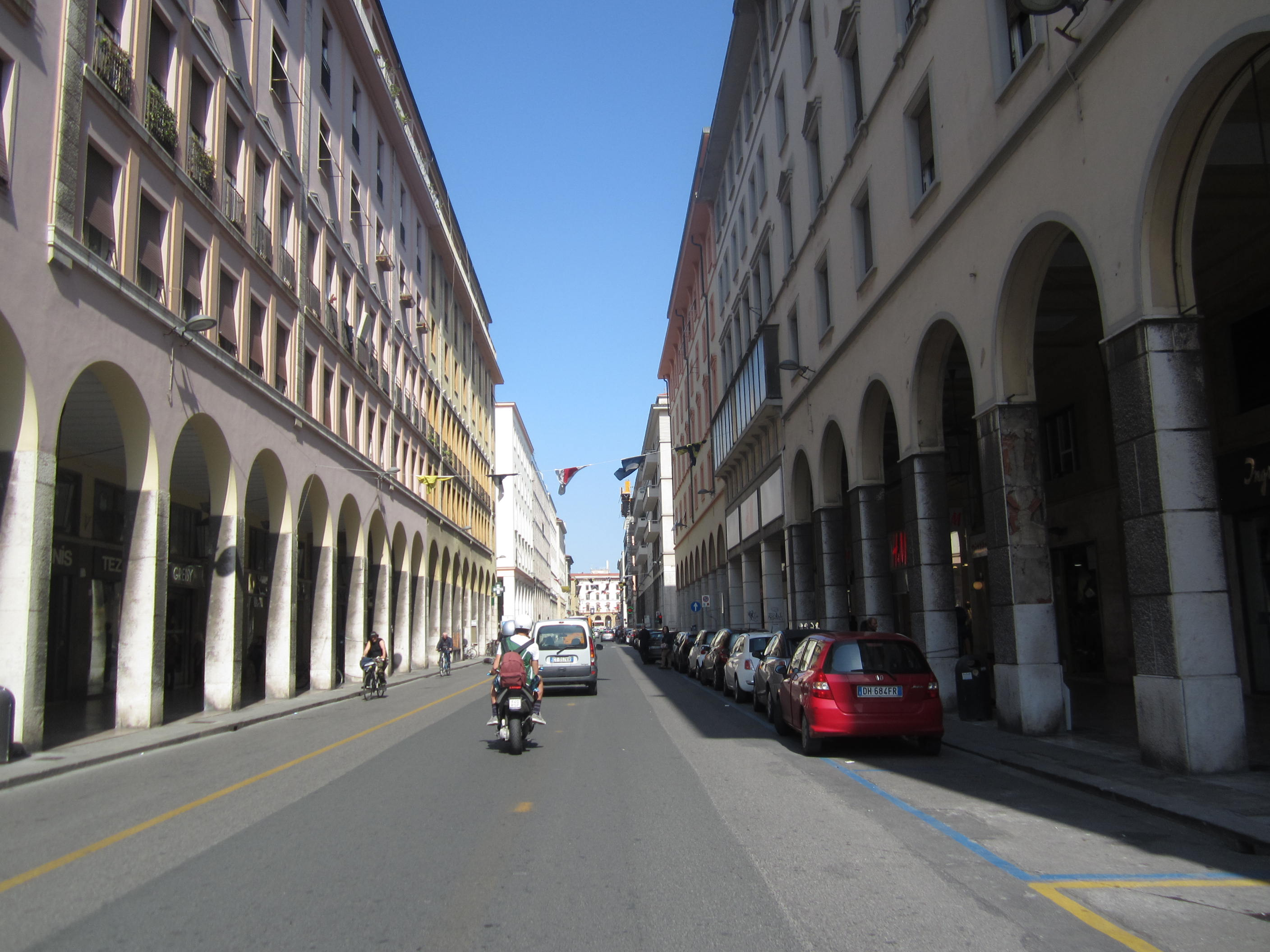
Image of Teatro La Gran Guardia theatre

Teatro La Gran Guardia is the main theatre of Livorno, Italy, opened in 1955.
