= Dermstore =

Online beauty retailer

- Website type: Online shopping
- Founded: 1999; 27 years ago
- Headquarters: El Segundo, California, {{{location_country}}}
- Area served: United States and Canada
- Owner: THG plc
- Founder: Craig A. Kraffert
- Products: Cosmetics
- Parent: THG Beauty
- Website: dermstore.com

Dermstore is a US web store which sells cosmetics and skin care products. In 2021, it was acquired by THG plc from Target Corporation for £260.9m and migrated onto the company's Ingenuity e-commerce platform.

== History ==
Dermstore was founded by dermatologist Craig Kraffert in 1999. In 2008, Dermstore launched a subscription service called BeautyFIX. The monthly subscription service offered beauty boxes containing skin care, hair care and makeup products for a fee. In 2012, the company expanded from distributing professional skin care to consumer cosmetics brands, and on March 19, 2013, the company opened its flagship store in Hermosa Beach, California.

On August 6, 2013, Target Corporation acquired the Dermstore Beauty Group. Dermstore became a wholly owned subsidiary of Target which operated as a separate entity under its online name, Dermstore.com. Dermstore's product offering consisted of over 350 brands

In December 2020, THG plc announced it would buy Dermstore from Target Corporation for $350 million. The deal closed on February 2, 2021 and Dermstore was migrated onto THG's Ingenuity e-commerce platform.
