= That'll Be the Day (musical) =

British touring variety show

- Origin: United Kingdom
- Genres: Rock 'n' roll, rock, pop
- Years active: 1986–present
- Members: Trevor Payne; Gary Anderson; Nikki Renee Hechavarria; Lotty Anderson; Ollie Gray; Mark Street; Jarrod Loughlin; Eduardo Neto; Seán McAusland; Jodie Lawson
- Website: ThatllBetheDay.com

That'll Be the Day (abbreviated as TBTD) is a touring rock 'n' roll variety show playing theatres and concert halls throughout the United Kingdom. That'll Be the Day was first performed in 1986 and spuriously claims to be the longest running rock 'n' roll show in the UK. (Note: Showaddywaddy have been touring since the 1970s, for example.) Since its creation, That'll Be the Day has been written, directed and produced by Trevor Payne, who also performs in the show.

== History ==
In its initial years, That'll Be the Day was a seasonal production performed during the spring and autumn months. In 1988, the show became a weekly attraction at Butlins holiday resort in Minehead, Somerset. The following year, the show's regular dates in Minehead were supported with additional performances throughout the South of England, including Butlins in Bognor Regis and the Portsmouth Pyramids Centre in Southsea. Later in 1989, the first Christmas edition of That'll Be the Day was performed.

Playing chiefly at holiday resorts and clubs, That'll Be the Day enjoyed increasing popularity during the early 1990s and became an all-year-round production. In 1994, the show made its theatre debut, performing at the Marlowe Theatre in Canterbury. Shortly afterwards, further interest from theatres culminated in performances at the Princess Theatre, Torquay, the Pavilion Theatre, Ilfracombe, and the Bristol Hippodrome.

In 1995, That'll Be the Day became firmly established as a theatre show, playing at venues nationwide (including the first of five appearances at the London Palladium). However, the show's adaptability ensured that theatre dates could still be supplemented with corporate work: following interest from international promoters, the show also played dates in Wales and Scotland during the mid-1990s.

After the recruitment in 1995 of West End-based promoter Derek Block, the latter half of the 1990s saw That'll Be the Day playing increasingly larger theatres and concert halls, as well as the smaller venues in which its reputation had been built. In 1997, the south coast resort of Bournemouth became the principal location for That'll Be the Day's summer seasons, the show being performed across eight weeks at the Pavilion Theatre. In 2002, a venue change saw the production's summer season successfully moved from Bournemouth's Pavilion Theatre to the 3000 seat Windsor Hall in the Bournemouth International Centre. Bournemouth remains the location for That'll Be the Day's summer seasons.

=== 21st century ===
In the noughties, That'll Be the Day continue to perform in excess of 210 shows a year throughout the United Kingdom and Europe, including three tours of Denmark (in 2003, 2007 and 2008) and a week-long residency at a theatre in Munster, Germany (in 2005). In 2016, the show celebrated its 30th anniversary with a special gala performance at the London Palladium.

In 2018, the show released a charity single recorded at Abbey Road Studios for the Make-A-Wish Foundation. The show has also raised funds for other charities including Childline and Help for Heroes.

During the COVID-19 lockdown in the United Kingdom, That'll Be the Day was streamed to British homes. Prior to the lockdown, it had been performing more than 200 shows a year.

== Format ==
That'll Be the Day is a retrospective of popular music, taking audiences from early 1950s rock 'n' roll through the 1960s, 1970s, and 1980s. Audiences are encouraged to sing along to hits by artists such as Elvis Presley, the Beatles, the Rolling Stones, Cliff Richard, Tina Turner, and Whitney Houston. Other musical artists who have been featured over the years include Lonnie Donegan, Buddy Holly, the Tremeloes, and the Seekers. The show also includes comedy routines.

== Reception ==
The show claims to have performed to over five million people over 35 years, including several superfans who have seen the show hundreds of times. In 2010, a review in The Citizen Gloucestershire called the show an evening of "unashamed nostalgia" that brought many famous artists back to life to "an enthusiastic and responsive audience" at a "brisk pace". The Citizen also praised the "clever impersonation" of Bruce Forsyth by Gary Anderson, and noted that "Trevor Payne, Julia Greenham and Nikki Renee Hechavarria stood out in a generally splendid, dynamic team full of talent and energy, where the nostalgia and humour combined to delight a large audience."
