= Rebound =

Rebound can refer to:

== Film and television ==
- Rebound (1931 film), a 1931 movie starring Ina Claire and Robert Ames
- Rebound (American TV series), a TV series produced by Bing Crosby
- Rebound (1959 film), a 1959 movie starring Lyndon Brook and Jane Hylton
- Rebound (2005 film), a 2005 movie starring Martin Lawrence and Megan Mullally
- Rebound (2009 film), a 2009 movie directed by Afdhere Jama
- The Rebound, a 2009 movie starring Catherine Zeta-Jones
- The Rebound (2016 film), a 2016 documentary about the Miami Heat Wheels wheelchair basketball team
- Rebound (2023 film), a South Korean sports drama film
- Rebound (2011 TV series), a 2011 Japanese TV series
- Rebound (game show), a 2015 British game show
- Rebound: The Legend of Earl "The Goat" Manigault, a 1996 HBO television movie starring Don Cheadle

== Music ==
- Rebound!, stylized as REbound!, a Swedish pop boy band duo
- Rebound (Jessica Sierra album), a 2010 album by Jessica Sierra
- Rebound (Eleanor Friedberger album), a 2018 album by Eleanor Friedberger
- Rebound, an album by Wayman Tisdale
- "Rebound" (Arty and Mat Zo song), 2011
- "Rebound" (Sebadoh song), 1994
- "Rebound", a 2022 song by Anson Kong and Alton Wong
- "Rebound", a 2007 song by Monrose from Strictly Physical
- "The Rebound", a song by Tristan Prettyman from the album Cedar + Gold

== Sports ==
- Rebound (sports), the ball becoming freely available after a failed attempt to put it into the goal
- Rebound (basketball), the act of successfully gaining possession of the ball after a missed goal
- Rebound sports, trampolining and similar gymnastic sports that use springed apparatus to propel the gymnast into the air
- Wallyball or "rebound volleyball"
- Rebound exercise or "rebounding"

== Other uses ==
- Rebound (dating), a short period of time following a particularly painful break-up
- Rebound (character), a fictional comic book character created by Scott Wherle and Ted Wing III
- Rebound, a sequel to the manga Harlem Beat
- Rebound (video game), a 1974 arcade game released by Atari, Inc.
- Rebound tenderness, also known as Blumberg's sign, a medical sign that indicates peritonitis
- Rebound effect, the tendency of a symptom to return when a medication is discontinued or is no longer effective
- Rebound effect (conservation), a reduction in expected gains from new technologies that increase the efficiency of resource use
- Rebound headache, usually occurring when analgesics are taken too frequently for headache relief
- Post-glacial rebound, the rise of land masses that were depressed by the huge weight of ice sheets during the last ice age
- Operation Rebound authorities investigation, to find the murder of NBA player Lorenzen Wright
- Rebound, a play by Donald Ogden Stewart

== See also ==
- On the Rebound (disambiguation)
