= Bidrohi =

Bidrohi (lit. 'rebel') may refer to:

- "Bidrohi" (poem), Bengali poem by Kazi Nazrul Islam (1921)
- Bidrohi (film), 2022 Bangladeshi film featuring Shakib Khan

== See also ==
- Bidrohini, 2020 Indian Bengali language action film by Sandip Chowdhury
- Vidrohi or Ramashankar Yadav (1957–2015), Indian poet
- Vidrohi (TV series), Indian television series about the Indian independence movement
