= Rebel (surname) =

The surname or nickname Rebel may refer to:

- Hans Rebel (1861–1940), Austrian entomologist
- Jean-Féry Rebel (1666–1747), French Baroque composer and violinist
- François Rebel (1701–1775), French Baroque composer and violinist, son of Jean-Féry
- Jett Rebel (born 1991), Dutch singer-songwriter
- Johnny Rebel (singer) (born 1938), Cajun country musician Clifford Joseph Trahan
- Lise-Lotte Rebel (born 1951), Danish Lutheran bishop
- Tony Rebel (born 1992), Jamaican reggae deejay Patrick George Anthony Barrett
- Robbie Rebel, The Beano comic character

== See also ==
- Rebel (given name)
