= Sándor Márai =

Hungarian writer (1900–1989)

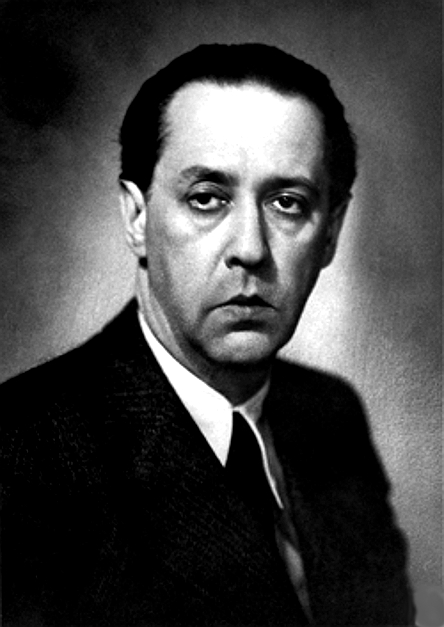
- Márai in the early 1940s
- Born: Sándor Károly Henrik Grosschmid de Mára; April 11, 1900; Kassa, Austria-Hungary (now Košice, Slovakia)
- Died: February 21, 1989 (aged 88); San Diego, California, United States
- Education: Leipzig University; Eötvös Loránd University
- Occupations: Novelist, poet, journalist, translator, screenwriter, essayist
- Writing career
- Language: Hungarian
- Period: 1918–1989
- Genres: Prose, poetry, drama, journalism
- Notable works: Embers (A gyertyák csonkig égnek); The Rebels (Zendülők)
- Notable awards: Kossuth Prize (1990); Hungarian Heritage Award (1996)
- Movements: influenced by Thomas Mann, Gyula Krúdy, and Joseph Roth

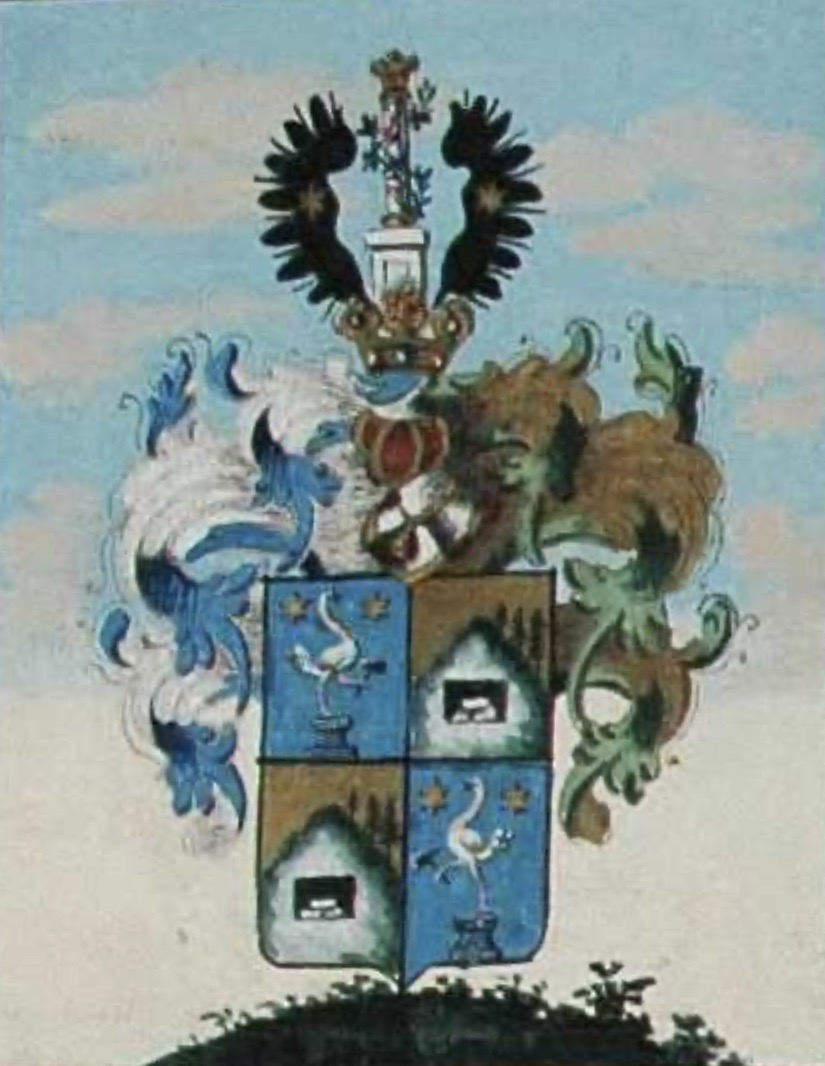
Arms of the family Grosschmid de Mára

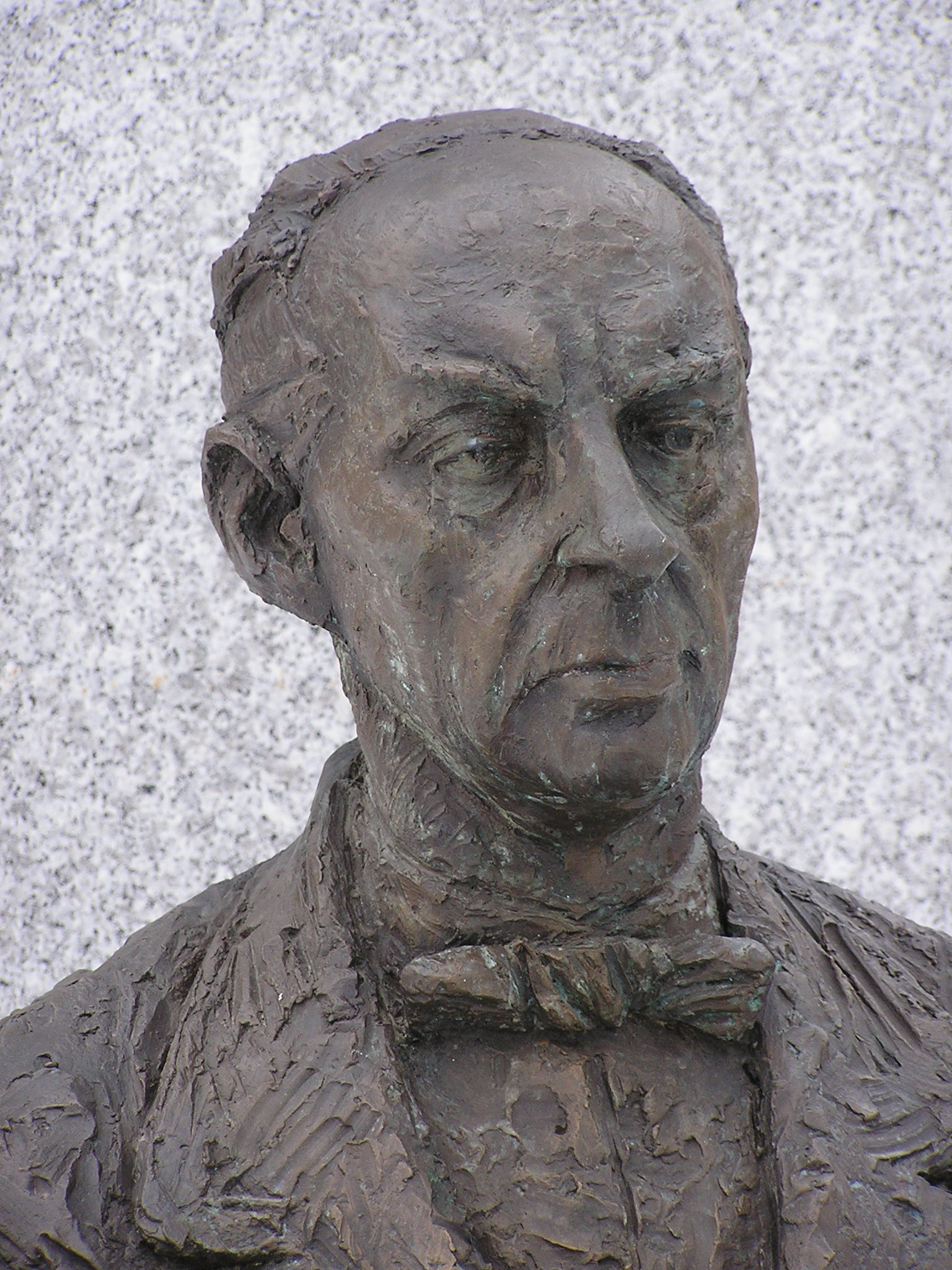
Sándor Márai (detail of his statue in Košice, Slovakia)

Sándor Márai (Hungarian: [ˈʃaːndor ˈmaːrɒi]; Archaic English name: Alexander Márai; 11 April 1900 – 21 February 1989) was a Hungarian writer, poet, and journalist.

== Biography ==
Márai was born on 11 April 1900 in the city of Kassa, Hungary (now Košice, Slovakia). Through his father, he was a relative of the Hungarian noble Országh family. In 1919, as a young man, enthusiastically supported the Hungarian Soviet Republic and worked as a journalist. He briefly joined the Communists, becoming the founder of the "Activist and Anti-National Group of Communist Writers". After the fall of the Hungarian Soviet Republic, his family found it safer to leave the country, thus he continued his studies in Leipzig. Márai traveled to and lived in Frankfurt, Berlin, and Paris and briefly considered writing in German, but eventually chose his mother language, Hungarian, for his writings. In Egy polgár vallomásai (English: "Confessions of a citizen"), Márai identifies the mother tongue language with the concept of the nation itself. He settled in Krisztinaváros, Budapest, in 1928. In the 1930s, he gained prominence with a precise and clear realist style. He was the first person to write reviews of the work of Franz Kafka.

He wrote very enthusiastically about the First and Second Vienna Awards, in which as the result of the German-Italian arbitration Czechoslovakia and Romania had to give back part of the territories that Hungary lost in the Treaty of Trianon, including his native Kassa (Košice). Over this period of time, he grew highly critical of Nazis.

Márai authored 46 books. His 1942 book Embers (Hungarian title: A gyertyák csonkig égnek, meaning "The Candles Burn Down to the Stump") expresses a nostalgia for the bygone multi-ethnic, multicultural society of the Austro-Hungarian Empire, reminiscent of the works of Joseph Roth. In 2006 an adaptation of this novel for the stage, written by Christopher Hampton, was performed in London.

Contrary to his earlier beliefs, he disliked the communist regime that seized power after World War II, and imposed on himself self exile in 1948. After living for some time in Italy, Márai settled in the city of San Diego, in the United States. Márai joined Radio Free Europe between 1951 and 1968. Márai was extremely disappointed in the Western powers for not helping the Hungarian Revolution of 1956.

He continued to write in his native language, but was not published in English until the mid-1990s. Like other memoirs by Hungarian writers and statesmen, his Föld! Föld! was first published in the West in 1971, because it could not be published in the Hungary of the post-1956 Kádár era. The English version of this memoir was published posthumously in 2001. After his wife died in 1986, Márai retreated more and more into isolation. In 1987, he lived with advanced cancer and his depression worsened when he lost his adopted son, John. He ended his life with a gunshot to his head in San Diego in 1989. He left behind three granddaughters; Lisa, Sarah and Jennifer Márai.

Largely forgotten outside of Hungary, his work (consisting of poems, novels, and diaries) has only been recently "rediscovered" and republished in French (starting in 1992), Polish, Catalan, Italian, English, German, Spanish, Portuguese, Bulgarian, Czech, Slovak, Danish, Icelandic, Korean, Lithuanian, Dutch, Urdu and other languages too, and is now considered to be part of the 20th-century European literary canon.

== Evaluation ==
“Hungarian Sándor Márai was the insightful chronicler of a collapsing world." – Le Monde

"It is perhaps one of the [works that] thus impacted me a lot." – Dilma Rousseff on the book Embers.

== Bibliography ==
=== Translated into English ===
- The Rebels (1930, published in English in 2007, translation by George Szirtes), Hungarian title: A zendülők. ISBN 0-375-40757-X
- Esther's Inheritance (1939, published in English in 2008), Hungarian title: Eszter hagyatéka. ISBN 1-4000-4500-2
- Casanova in Bolzano (1940, published in English in 2004), Hungarian title: Vendégjáték Bolzanóban ISBN 0-375-71296-8
- Portraits of a Marriage (1941 & 1980, published in English in 2011), Hungarian titles: Az igazi (1941) and Judit... és az utóhang (1980) ISBN 978-1-4000-9667-1
- Embers (1942, published in English in 2001), Hungarian title: A gyertyák csonkig égnek. ISBN 0-375-70742-5
- Memoir of Hungary (1971, published in English in 2001), Hungarian title: Föld, föld...! ISBN 963-9241-10-5
- The Withering World: Selected Poems by Sandor Marai (Translations by John M. Ridland and Peter V. Czipott of 163 poems, published in English in 2013) ISBN 978-1-84749-331-6

== Gallery ==
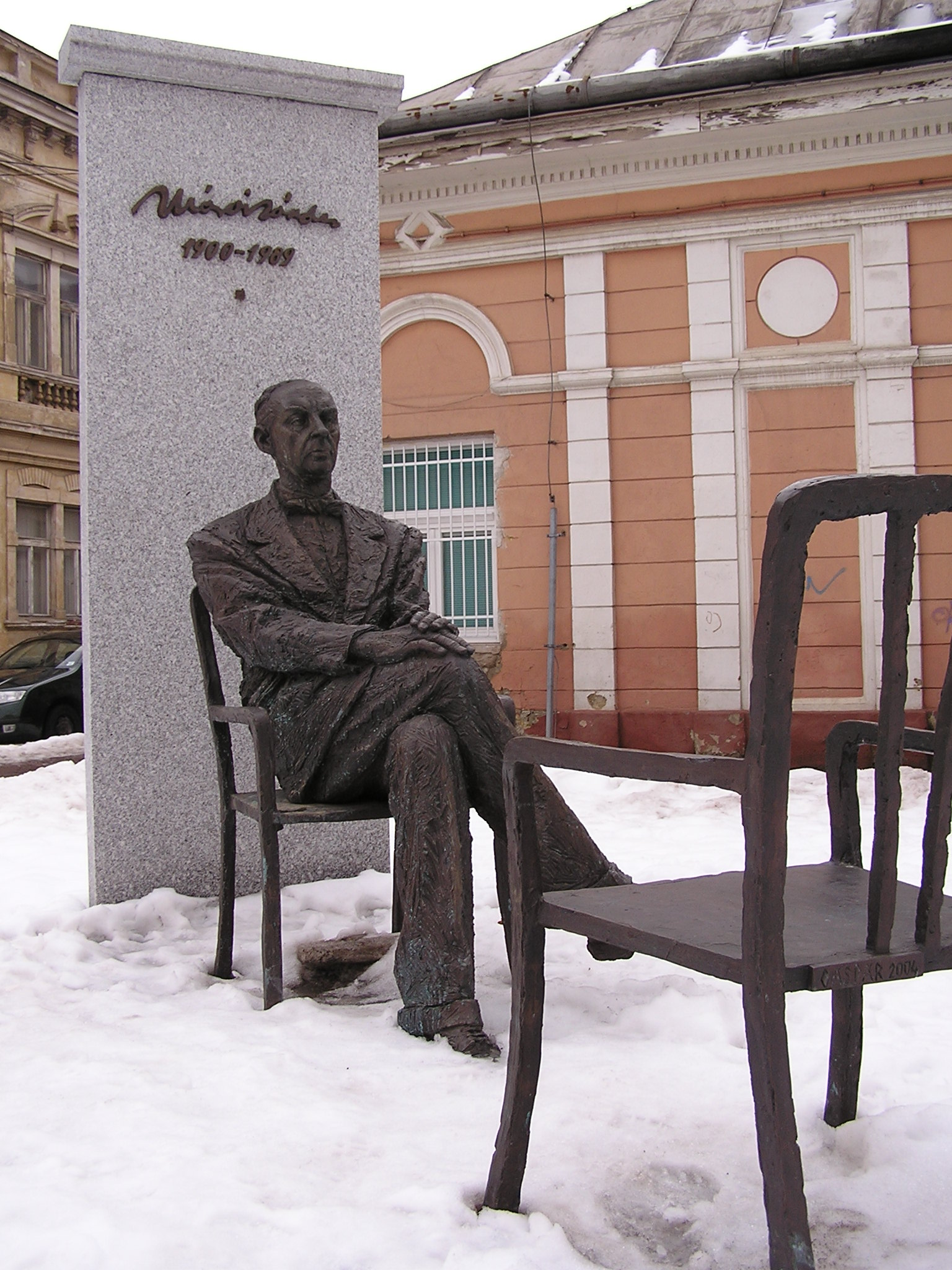
Statue of Márai
in Košice

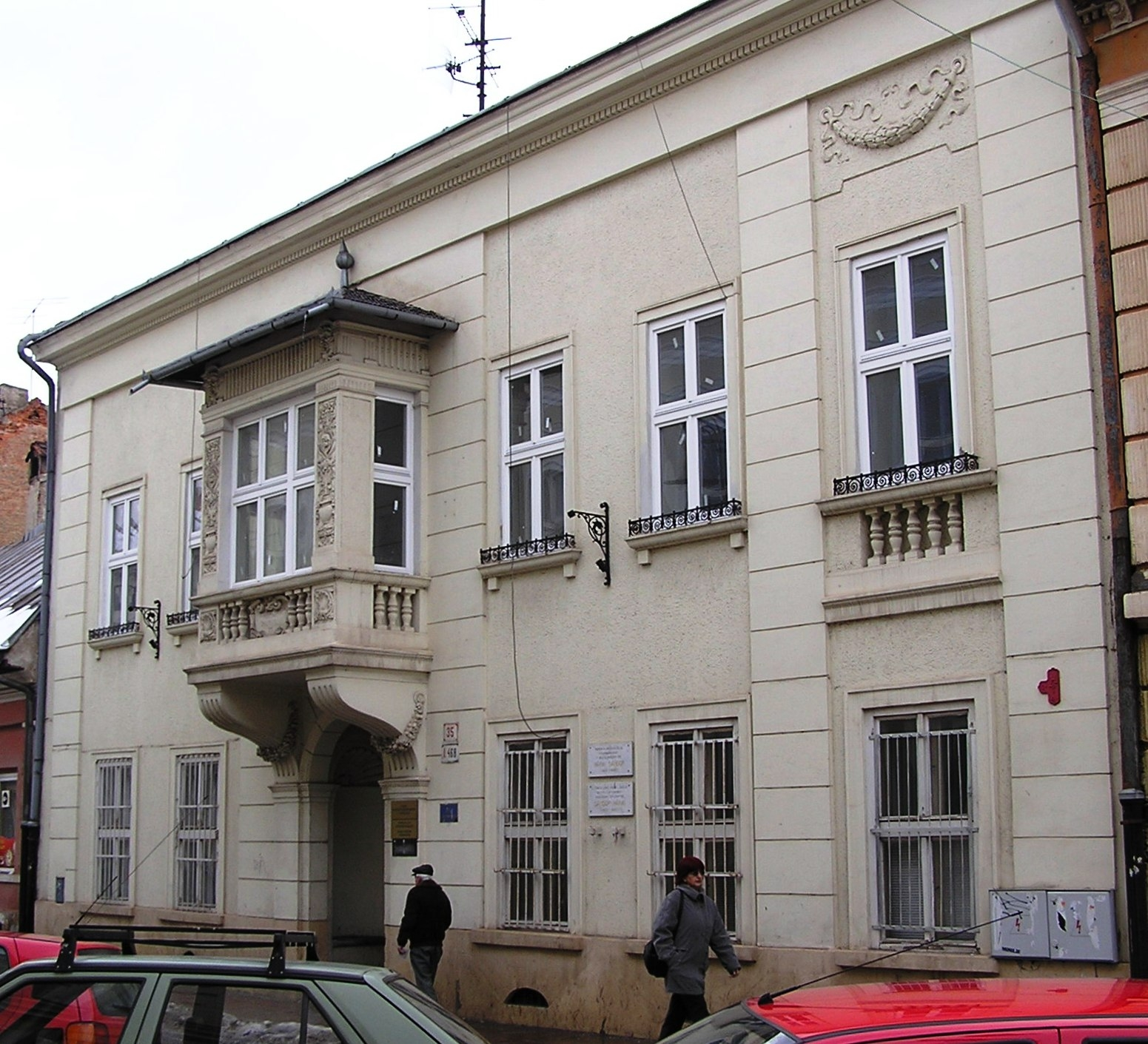
Márai's place of residence (today's Mäsiarska Street in Košice)

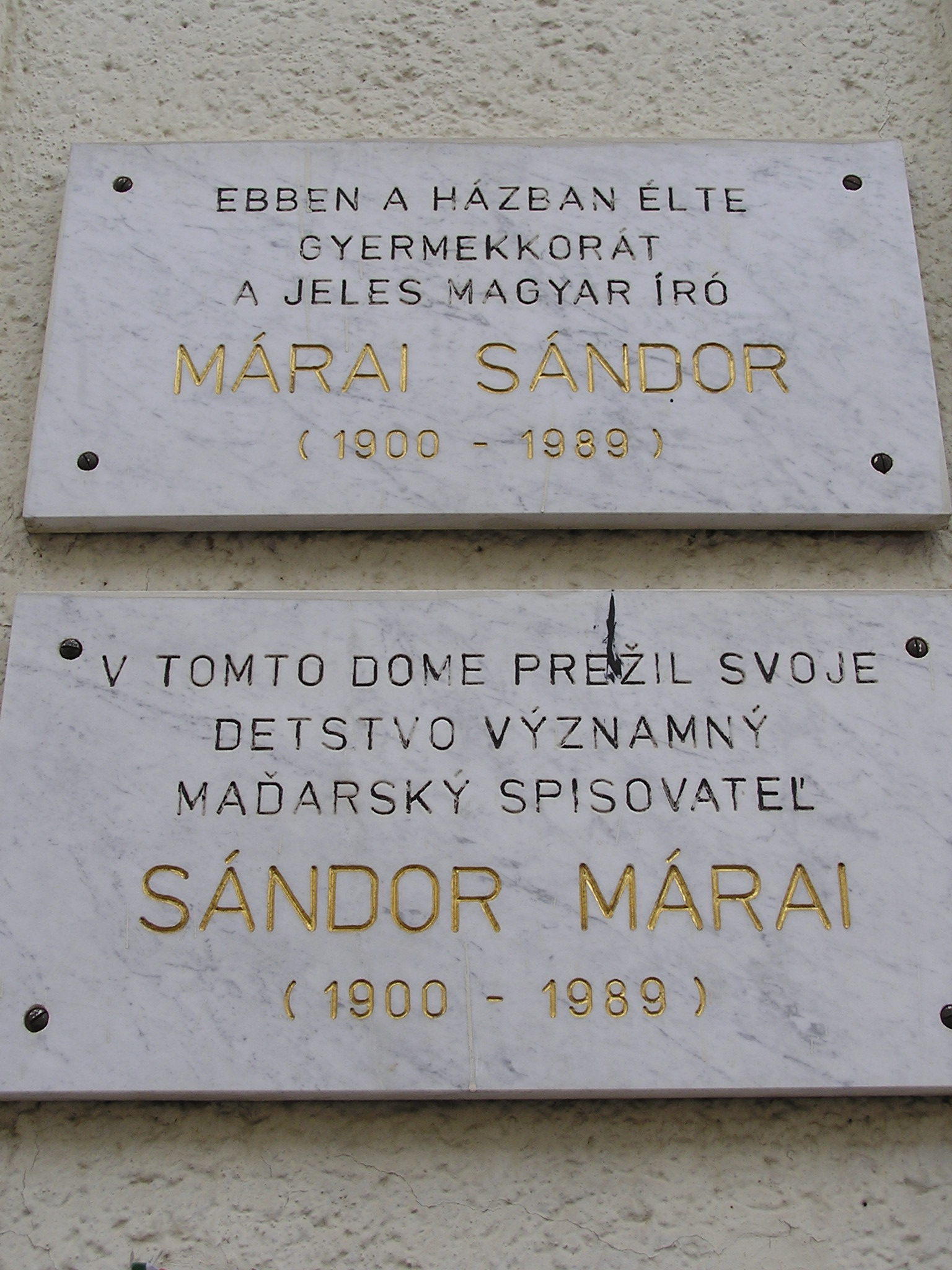
Memorial plates of Márai installed on the front of his birthplace (in Hungarian and Slovak)

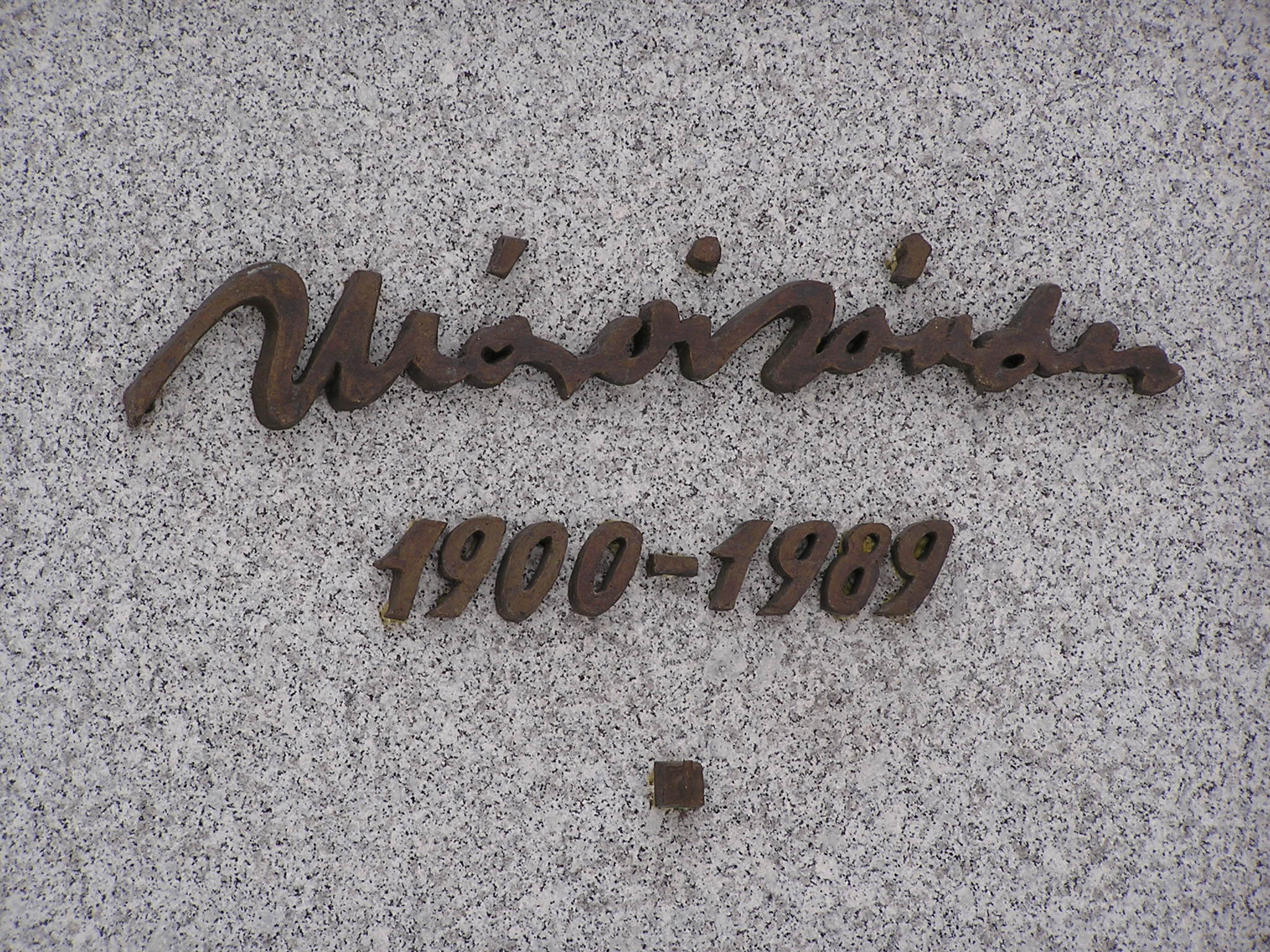
Márai's signature
(detail of his statue in Košice)

Statue of Márai
in Budapest's Mikó utca, Krisztinaváros

Márai's memorial on his former home in Krisztinaváros
