= The Rebel (1980 French film) =

1980 drama film by Gérard Blain

- French: Le Rebelle
- Directed by: Gérard Blain
- Written by: Gérard Blain; André Debaecque
- Produced by: Louis Duchesne
- Starring: Patrick Norbert
- Cinematography: Emmanuel Machuel
- Edited by: Jean-Philippe Berger
- Music by: Catherine Lara
- Production companies: ROC; Les Films du Pélican; Les Films Molière; Auditrust
- Distributed by: Films Molière; (French distribution)
- Release date: 12 November 1980
- Running time: 97 minutes
- Country: France
- Language: French

The Rebel (French: Le Rebelle) is a 1980 French drama film directed by Gérard Blain. The film was written by Blain and André Debaecque, and stars Patrick Norbert, Michel Subor, Isabelle Rosais, Jean-Jacques Aublanc and Françoise Michaud.

== Plot ==
The film revolves around Pierre who is a petty thief, taking care of his younger sister Nathalie. His father is dead and his mother is in the hospital dying. During one of his thefts, he meets a wealthy homosexual developer, Hubert Beaufils, who offers him work and financial security, in exchange for sexual favors. Meanwhile, he has also started associating with a group of radical leftists who are planning terrorist attacks. Refusing to work, he declares to his new friends: "I'm not going to slave for 2,000 a month, while some drunk pig can get fatter. My dad did that all his life."

When his mother dies, Pierre is informed by child services that he must find a legitimate job in order to keep legal custody of Nathalie. Beaufils contacts Pierre again with the same offer, but Pierre ends up breaking into Beaufils home while he is gone, stealing among other things, a gun, which he later shows off to his leftist friends, Alain and Corinne.

Since Pierre has refused to find a job, Nathalie is taken away from him and shipped off to a children's home. Desperate, he leaves their home and lives in a hotel for a while. After seeing Beaufils on television giving an interview, Pierre drives to his office building, and shoots him dead as he leaves the building. Escaping on his motorbike, Pierre then goes to find Nathalie. They spend the day together, but as they are leaving a movie theater, the police are waiting for them and separate them again, taking Pierre into custody for the last time.

== Cast ==
- Patrick Norbert as Pierre
- Michel Subor as Hubert Beaufils
- Isabelle Rosais as Nathalie
- Jean-Jacques Aublanc as Alain
- Françoise Michaud as Corinne
- Alain Jérôme as Jean-Claude
- Robert Delarue as the police commissar
- Germaine Ledoyen as Mme Roussel
- Monique Gilliot as the social assistant
- Maurice Rollet as André Chardonnet
- Hervé Claude as Hervé Claude

== Reception ==
Cinéma magazine opined that "the two characters, Pierre and Beaufils, give too much of an impression of gratuitousness, and are devoid of any originality; the behavior of the two main protagonists is too exaggerated to seem plausible." British film historian Peter Cowie wrote that "Blain's Le Rebelle offers the same stark style as his former films — a kind of controlled violence that is all the more powerful for being expressed in a subdued way; the hero of Blain's film rejects the order of things, looks for solutions that he does not find in the legal opposition, and resorts to killing."

Valérie Cadet of Le Monde wrote that "close to the filmmaker's convictions, Le Rebelle paints a certain picture of French society at the time and simultaneously prefigures its most radical developments, which can be bitterly observed some twenty-five years later — the disintegration of the working class, youth unemployment, the lies of ideologues, the worsening and rejection of marginality, the triumph of liberalism, the reign of standardization."

Christoph Huber argues in Cinema Scope that the "tumultuous social background of the film, ranging from the laid-off demonstrating for work in the street to the luxurious recreational spots of the rich, ultimately and literally reasserts itself with a vengeance, but to no resolution; instead, Pierre is given a last scene with his sister for a beach afternoon, where he tells her 'you must not cry, Natalie. You have to fight'." Huber concludes that this scene "might serve as an epigraph for the work of Blain, who was a director who would not cease to fight for his idea of truthfulness."

== See also ==
- Cinema of France
- List of French-language films
- List of LGBTQ-related films of 1980
