= Home accessories =

Interior design items

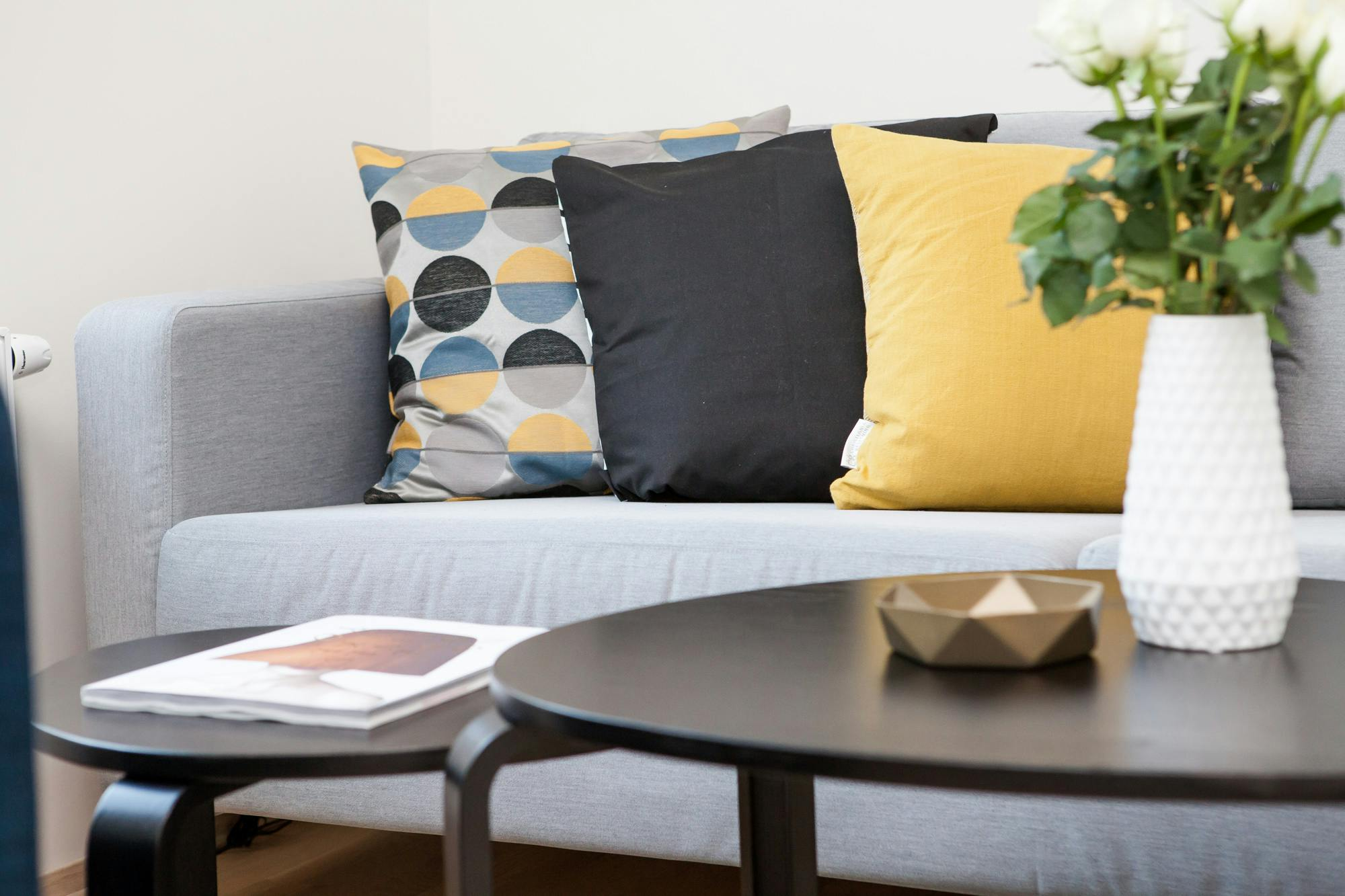
Home decor accessories

Home accessories (also termed home decor) are decorative and functional items placed in living spaces. These items are typically easy to replace, move, and rearrange, allowing for flexibility in interior design.

== Types ==
Home accessories encompass a wide range of products that complement the primary furniture and architectural elements of a home.

They can be categorized into several broad groups:

=== Decorative items ===
- Wall art (paintings, prints, photographs)
- Sculptures and figurines
- Vases and bowls
- Candles and candleholders
- Mirrors
- Clocks

=== Functional decor ===
- Bookends
- Picture frames
- Decorative storage boxes
- Trays and baskets

=== Textiles ===
- Curtains and drapes
- Throw pillows and cushions
- Area rugs and carpets
- Tablecloths and runners
- Blankets and throws

=== Lighting ===
- Table lamps
- Floor lamps
- Pendant lights
- String lights

=== Plants and floral arrangements ===
- Potted plants
- Artificial plants
- Fresh or dried flower arrangements

== Role in interior design ==
Home accessories play a role in interior design by:

1. Adding color, texture, and visual interest: Accessories introduce variety to a space through different materials, patterns, and hues, creating depth and complexity in the overall design.
2. Reflecting personal style: They allow homeowners to express their individuality and tastes, making spaces more unique and personalized.
3. Creating focal points: Strategically placed accessories can draw attention to specific areas of a room, guiding the eye and creating visual hierarchy.
4. Enhancing ambiance: The right accessories can significantly influence the mood and atmosphere of a space, contributing to its overall feel.
5. Providing functional elements: Many accessories serve dual purposes, offering both aesthetic appeal and practical use, such as decorative storage solutions or artistic lighting fixtures.
6. Balancing design elements: Accessories help to create equilibrium between different design components, ensuring a harmonious overall look.
7. Adding layers and depth: Through the use of various accessories, designers can create visual layers that add complexity and interest to a space.
8. Connecting different areas: Accessories can be used to create a cohesive look throughout a home, linking different rooms through repeated elements or themes.
9. Adapting to trends: Smaller decorative items allow for easier updates to a space's style without major renovations, keeping interiors current.
10. Improving spatial perception: Certain accessories, like mirrors or strategically placed lighting, can make spaces appear larger or more open.

== Cultural history ==
Home accessories have played significant roles in various cultures throughout history, often reflecting societal values, status, beliefs, and artistic traditions.

Different cultures have developed unique home accessories:

- Chinese porcelain, dating back to the Tang dynasty (618–907 CE), became highly prized along trade routes and influenced global ceramic traditions.
- Persian rugs, embodying elements of Iranian history and mythology, have been handwoven for centuries and are recognized worldwide for their craftsmanship.
- African masks, used in various ceremonies across West, Central, and Southern Africa, have become internationally recognized art forms.
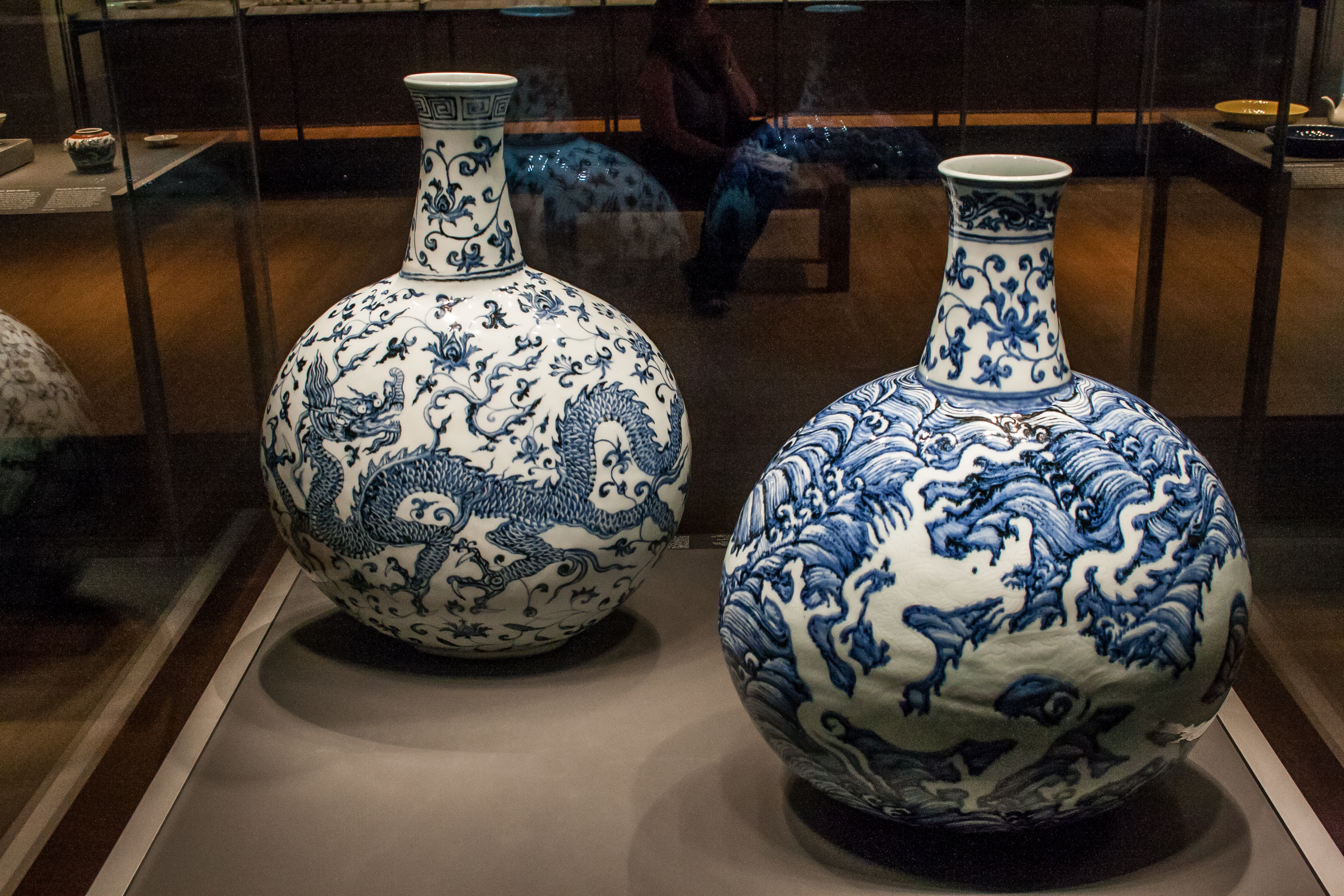
A pair of complementary flasks from Yongle period (1402–1424)

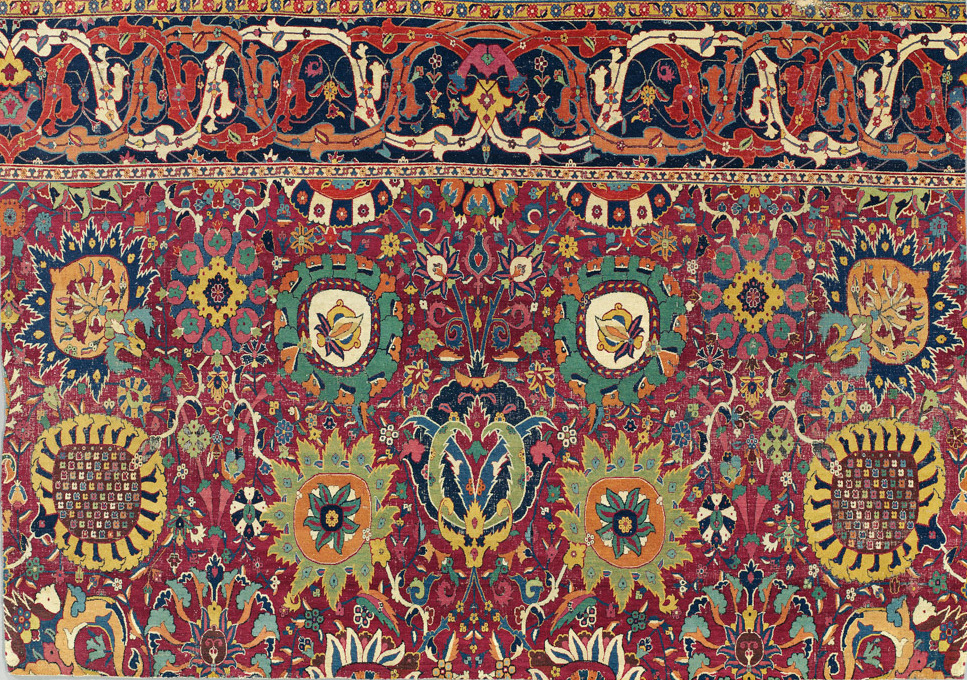
17th century carpet fragment, southeast Persia

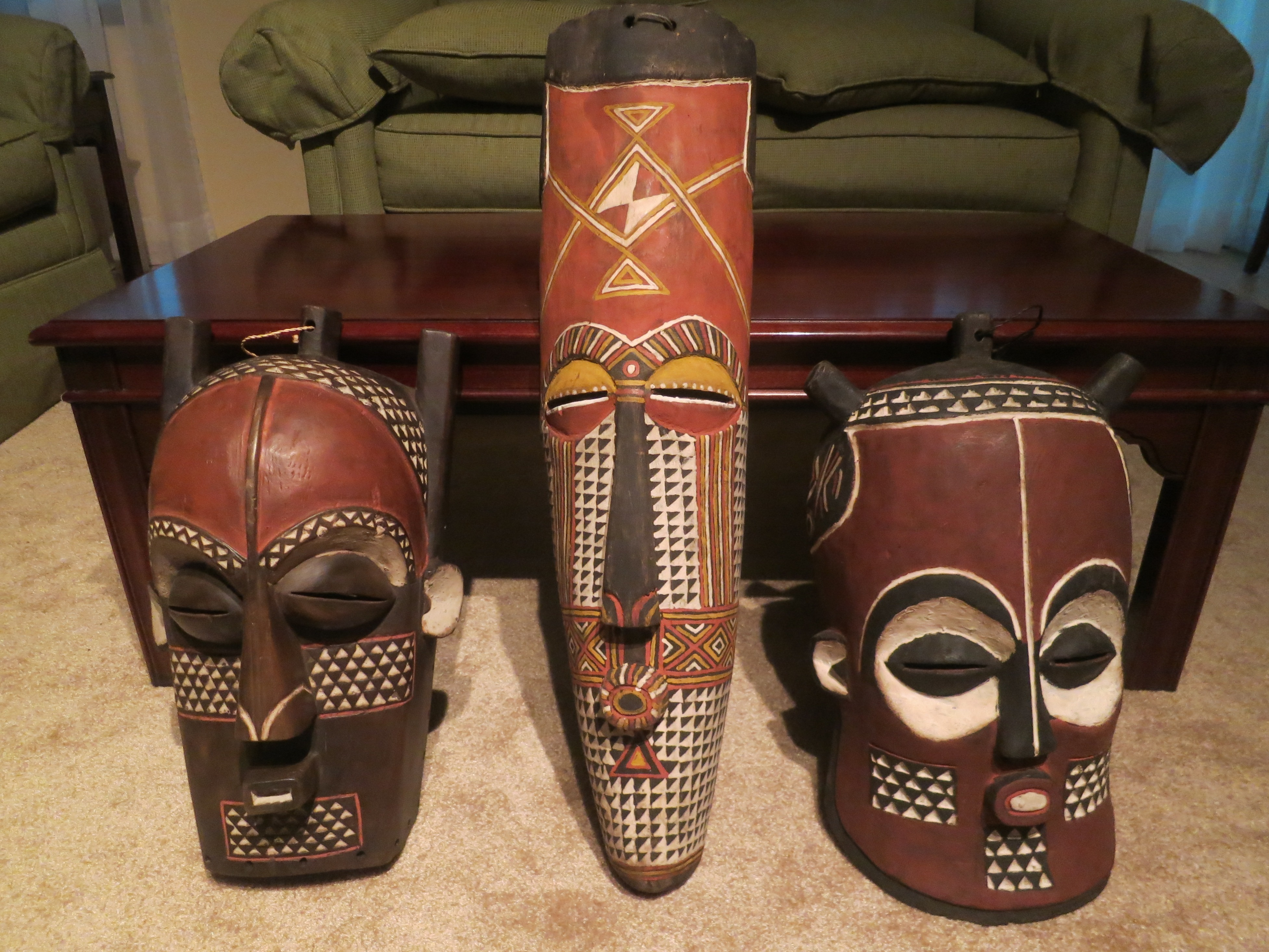
Masks from the Kongo Central region

The global trade of these and other decorative items has led to significant cross-cultural influences in home decor. Today, many traditional accessories have transcended their original cultural contexts to become internationally recognized design elements.
