= Aliprandi =

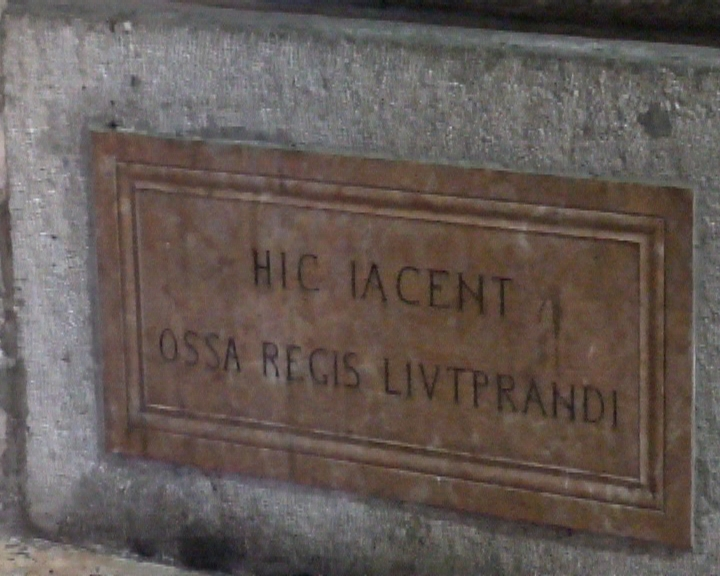
Plaque marking the casket containing Liutprand's bones in San Pietro in Ciel d'Oro in Pavia

Coat of arms of Family Aliprandi

The Aliprandi is an Italian family originally from Milan, descending from the Lombards. Wealthy feudal lands in various parts of Lombardy, had supremacy over the city of Monza in municipal period. The House of Aliprandi gave the Catholic Church Blessed Catherine Aliprandi.

== Origins ==
An ancient tradition derives the lineage of Aliprandi from the great Lombard King Liutprand (712–744). Documentation of this link consists of ancient manuscripts and other sources. The derivation of the Lombard royal lineage is attested by an inscription dated 1131 in the Church of Santa Maria delle Grazie in Monza, published by eminent historians such as Cantù and Giulini and admitted as proof of nobility for the reception in Order of Santo Stefano and Noble College of Giureconsulti in Milan.

The family Aliprandi was feudal in the eponymous village, which was an independent municipality until the late 19th century, when it was annexed to the city of Lissone.

In Milan, the family appears in the list of noble houses that draw from Ottone Visconti in 1277. Giovanni Aliprandi (1220) begat three sons, Arnolfo, Garibaldo and Bertarino, grandfather of Enrico, Lord of Monza. Giovannolo became the immediate vassal (with the rank of nobility, eminent) of Count Palatine and noble of the Holy Roman Empire with his brothers, his nephew and descendants of Emperor Charles IV of Holy Roman Empire on May 15, 1355.

== The Aliprandi-Fanzago ==
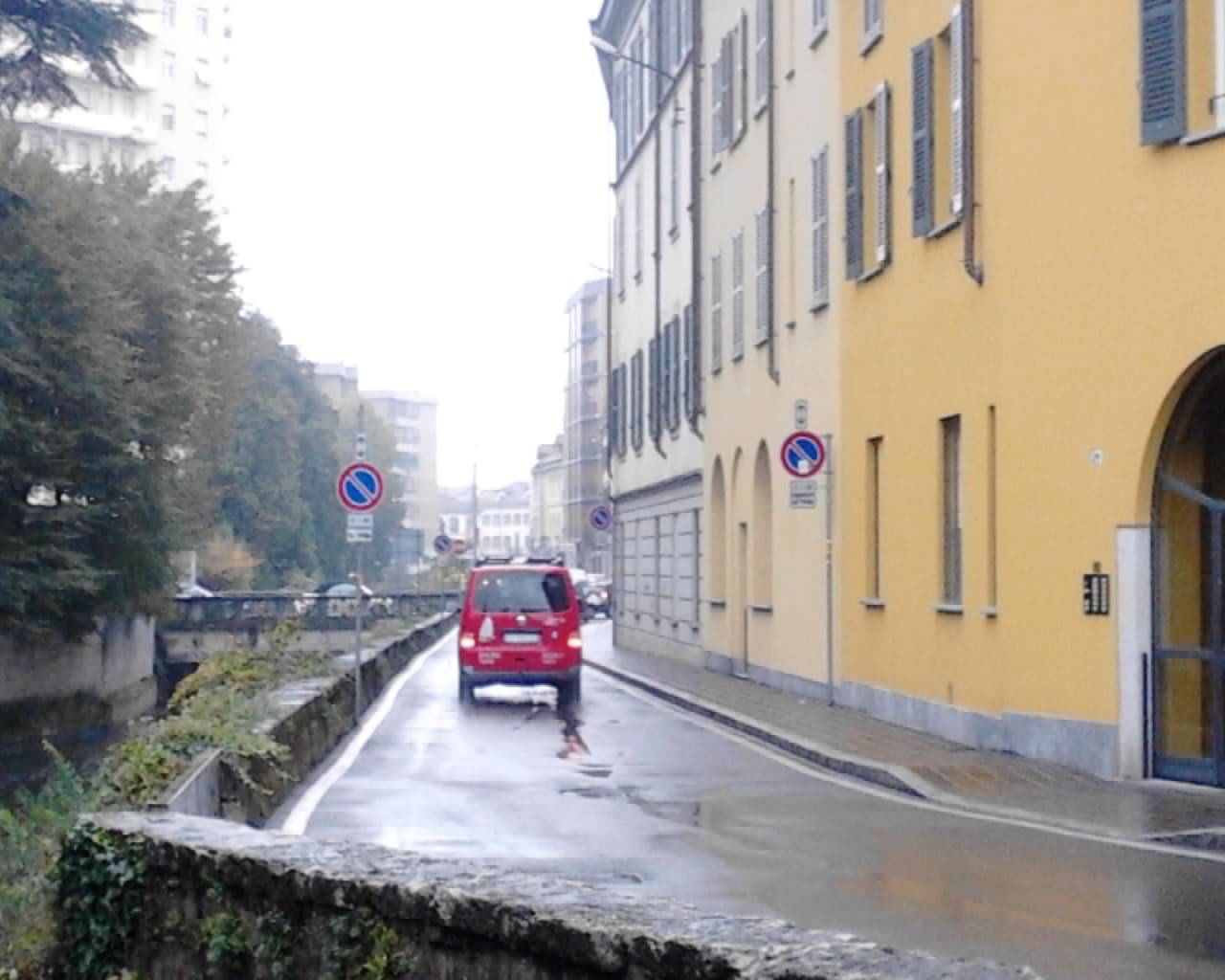
Via Aliprandi in Monza

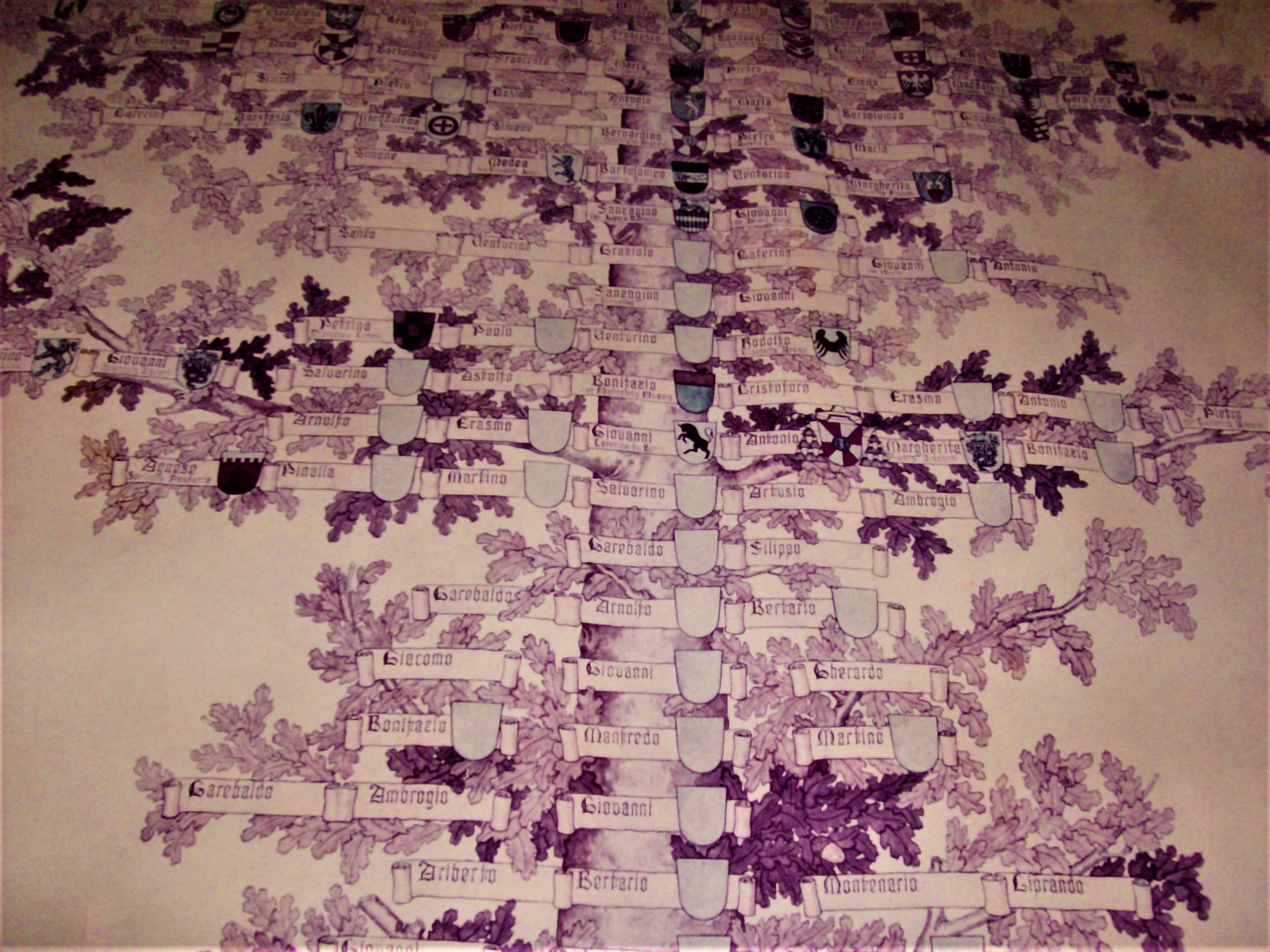
Genealogy of the house of Aliprandi Fanzago where figure Giovanni Aliprandi (1220), his sons and descendants.

Coat of arms of Family Fanzago-Aliprandi

An important branch of the family lived in Clusone in Val Seriana (near Bergamo). At the time of Count Antonio Venturino the family name was changed to Fanzago.

== Other Branches ==
In Verona, a branch appeared in the 15th century as heir to the name and substance of the canon and the Count Palatine Bartolomeo Cartolari. The surname of Cartolari was ascribed to the Noble Council in 1524 and still flourishes in the same city as the best-known survivors of the branches of the lineage of Aliprandi.

The nobleman Giulio Cesare Aliprandi, son of Gaspare Aliprandi, brother of Luigi in 1587 received the Order of Santo Stefano, was admitted in 1584 with proof of nobility in the college of Nobles Giureconsulti of Milan. That branch of the family continues to live in Ferrara.

The branch of Abruzzo became extinct in 1910. It had descended from Count Paolo di Bonifazio di Giovannolo, started in Penne by Giovanni Aliprandi. Giovanni was Treasurer of Margaret of Habsburg daughter of Emperor Charles V, had various fiefdoms including Nocciano.

Giovanni Aliprandi married Valentina Visconti, the daughter of Barnabò Visconti, Lord of Milan. Giovanni was banned from Milan banned for political reasons in 1413, giving rise to another branch in Treviso.

== Notes ==
:

== See also ==
- Pinalla Aliprandi
- Martino Aliprandi
- Salvarino Aliprandi
- Giovanni Aliprandi
