= Orto Botanico Riserva Lago di Penne =

Botanical garden in Penne, Abruzzo, Italy

Orto botanico riserva Lago di Penne
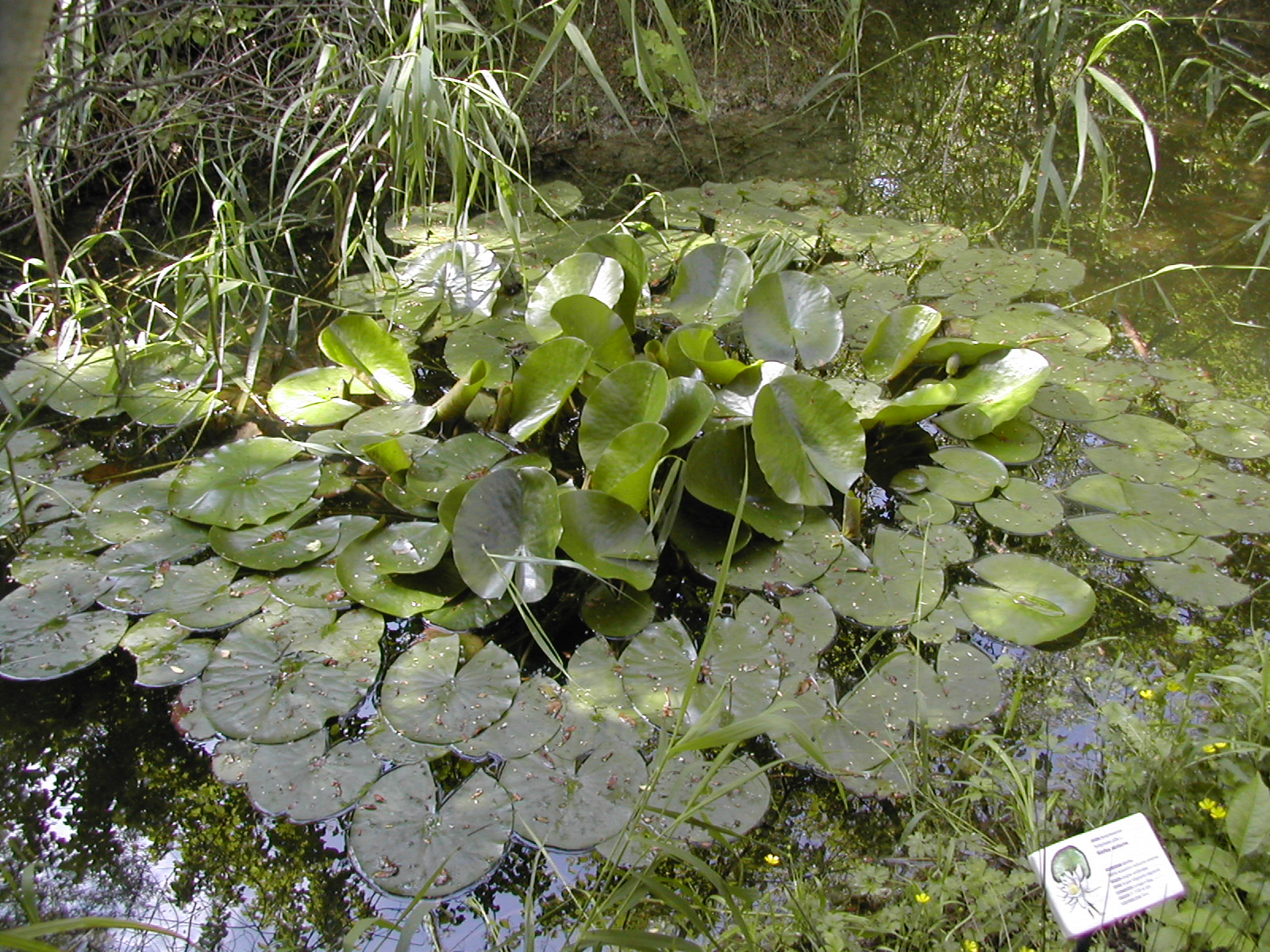
- Water lilies in the garden
- Interactive map of Orto botanico riserva Lago di Penne
- Type: Botanical garden
- Nearest city: Penne, Abruzzo
- Coordinates: 42.441211°N 13.904086°E
- Area: 1 hectare (2.5 acres)
- Elevation: 250 meters (820 ft)
- Authorized: 1988; 38 years ago
- Administrator: Comune di Penne
- Open: 365 days a year
- Website: www.cogecstre.com/index1.htm?ortobotanico.htm#ortobotanico

The Orto botanico riserva Lago di Penne (Italian: Botanical garden of the Penne Lake Preserve) is a botanical garden located within the Riserva Lago di Penne, southwest of Penne, Abruzzo, Italy. The garden was established in 1988 and contains plants organized by geography and ecological system.

== History ==
The garden itself covers 1 hectare. It was established in 1988, one year after the Riserva Lago di Penne. In 1997 it was recognized as a botanical garden of regional interest, pursuant to regional law n.35/1997. In 1998, the Reserve adopted a forest management plan using naturalistic silviculture principles.

== Organization ==
Visitors enter the garden along the lakeside after passing the visitor center. Continuing along the lake, their path encounters the Duck Center, the Otter Center, and wildlife areas dedicated to ferrets and tortoises.

This is followed by the main botanical walking path (Percorso Botanico). It includes a route dedicated to aromatic plant species, set up for the blind with interpretive signs in Braille, and sections dedicated to Maquis shrubland, downy oak-dominated xeric forest, black hornbeam-dominated mesic forest, riparian forest, and wetland. The garden's plants are arranged by geography and ecology, rather than by taxonomy, in order to reconstruct Abruzzo's major plant associations.

== Natural history ==
The Orto botanico riserva Lago di Penne is located at 250 m elevation, along the lake shore, with an extension of slightly less than 1 ha along the basin of the river Tavo. The Tavo is a right-hand tributary of the river Saline, on which the Penne dam was built.

Outside specifically cultivated areas, the garden's current wetland vegetation is the result of natural post-dam colonization and succession. Its wild upland vegetation results mostly from reforestation efforts. Before the construction of the dam and the creation of the Riserva and the Orto Botanico, the landscape consisted of farmland with woodlot strips. The area's native climax vegetation is dominated by holm oak.

Geologically, the garden occupies part of a sedimentary basin of upper Miocene to lower Pliocene age, consisting of alternating shales and sandstones. Such stratigraphy is landslide-prone due to the differing behavior of shale-derived clays and sandstone-derived sand when saturated with water. The purpose of the Riserva and the Orto Botanico includes the maintenance of plant communities that help to anchor potentially-mobile sediments.

== See also ==
- List of botanical gardens in Italy
