= Fino (river) =

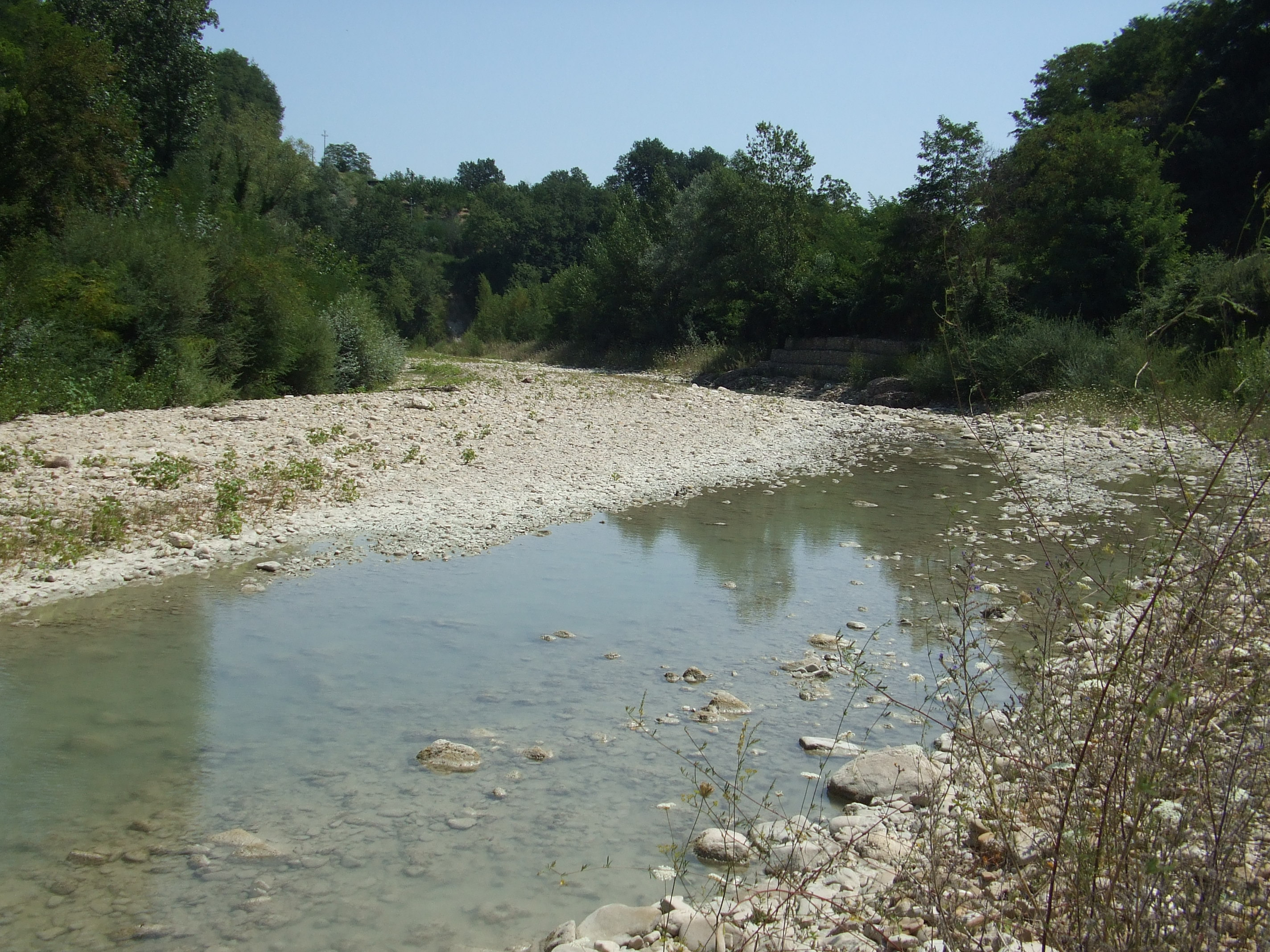
- The Fino near Bisenti

Location
- Country: Italy

Physical characteristics
- Source
  - location: Monte Camicia
- Mouth: Saline
  - coordinates: 42.4843°N 14.0953°E

Basin features
- Progression: Saline→ Adriatic Sea

The Fino is a river in east central Italy. Its source is near Monte Camicia in the province of Teramo in the Abruzzo region of Italy. The river flows northeast and then curves east before flowing past Bisenti. It continues flowing eastward and crosses into the province of Pescara near Elice. The river flows southeast until it joins the Tavo river and the two rivers become the Saline river.
