= Ragazzini =

Ragazzini is an Italian surname. Notable people with the surname include:

- Carlotta Ragazzini (born 2001), Italian para table tennis player
- Giovanni Battista Ragazzini (c. 1520–c. 1591), Italian painter
- John R. Ragazzini (1912–1988), American electrical engineer
