= Camicia =

Camicia may refer to:

- Monte Camicia, a mountain in the Abruzzo region of Italy
- Chimenti Camicia, an Italian Renaissance architect
- Jimmy Camicia, a founder of the theatre company Hot Peaches

== See also ==
- Blackshirts (Italian singular: Camicia Nera), an Italian fascist paramilitary group
- Chemise, a women's undergarment
- Garibaldi shirt, also known as camicia rossa
- Soldati-class destroyer, also known as the Camicia Nera class
  - Italian destroyer Camicia Nera
