= San Domenico, Penne, Abruzzo =

Church in Penne, Italy

Coordinates: 42.458397°N 13.927009°E

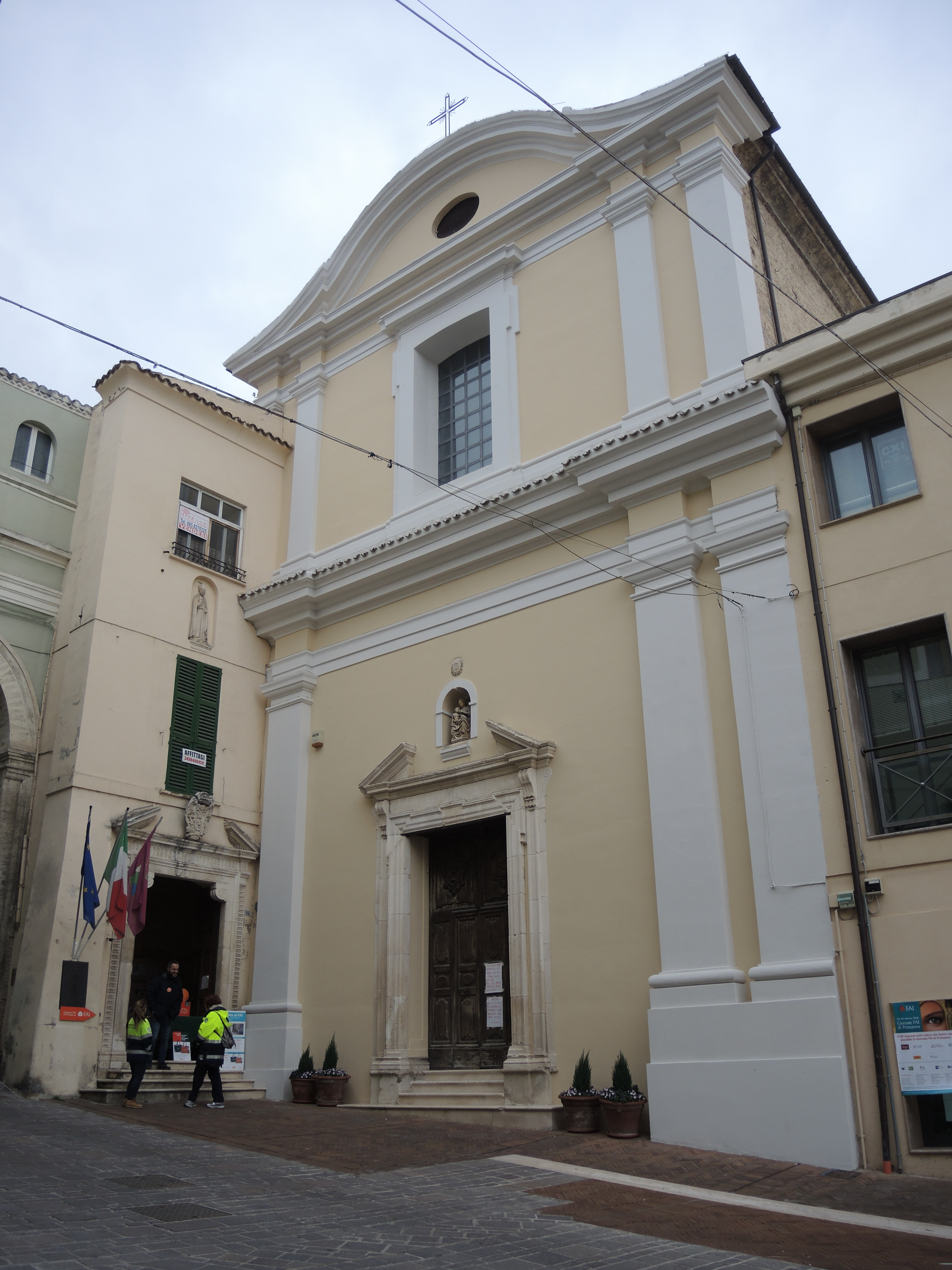
San Domenico facade

San Domenico is a Baroque-style Roman Catholic parish church located in Piazza Luca da Penna in the town of Penne, region of Abruzzo, Italy.

== History and description ==
Originally founded in the 13th century as part of a Dominican monastery in the town. Some of the funds were donated by the king of Naples, Charles II of Anjou, who also donated the relic putatively consisting of the skull of Saint Blaise.

Initially founded with a single nave and simple linear shape, the church underwent numerous refurbishment, from the 17th to 18th-century under the designs of Giovanni Battista Gianni, leading to the present interior Baroque style and decoration. The facade, completed in 1667, is simple and sober with and elegant Renaissance style portal and flanking pilasters. however the interior, has polychrome stone and decoration with gold-colored stucco accents. The vault has large frescoed panels. At the presbytery is a large elevated polychrome marble that towers over the nave and a semicircle of engraved oaken choir stalls attributed to Ferdinando Mosca of Pescocostanzo.

The nave ceiling stuccoes were completed by Sebastiano Carinole of Guardiagrele and Stefano Tereo. The wooden reliquary bust of St Blaise (1614) was completed by Michele Arnolfini.

In the left nave, one of the altars has a copy of the Pietà painted by Annibale Carracci. The main altarpiece is a depiction of the has a late-16th-century Madonna of the Rosary with Saints by Giovanni Battista Ragazzini. He painted other works in the church.
