= Pinalla Aliprandi =

- Coat of arms of Family Aliprandi
- Born: Monza, Duchy of Milan
- Died: Duchy of Milan
- Occupation: Commander
- Years active: 1329-1341

Pinalla Aliprandi (Monza, end of the 13th century - 1341) was a Milanese commander of the 14th century.

== Biography ==
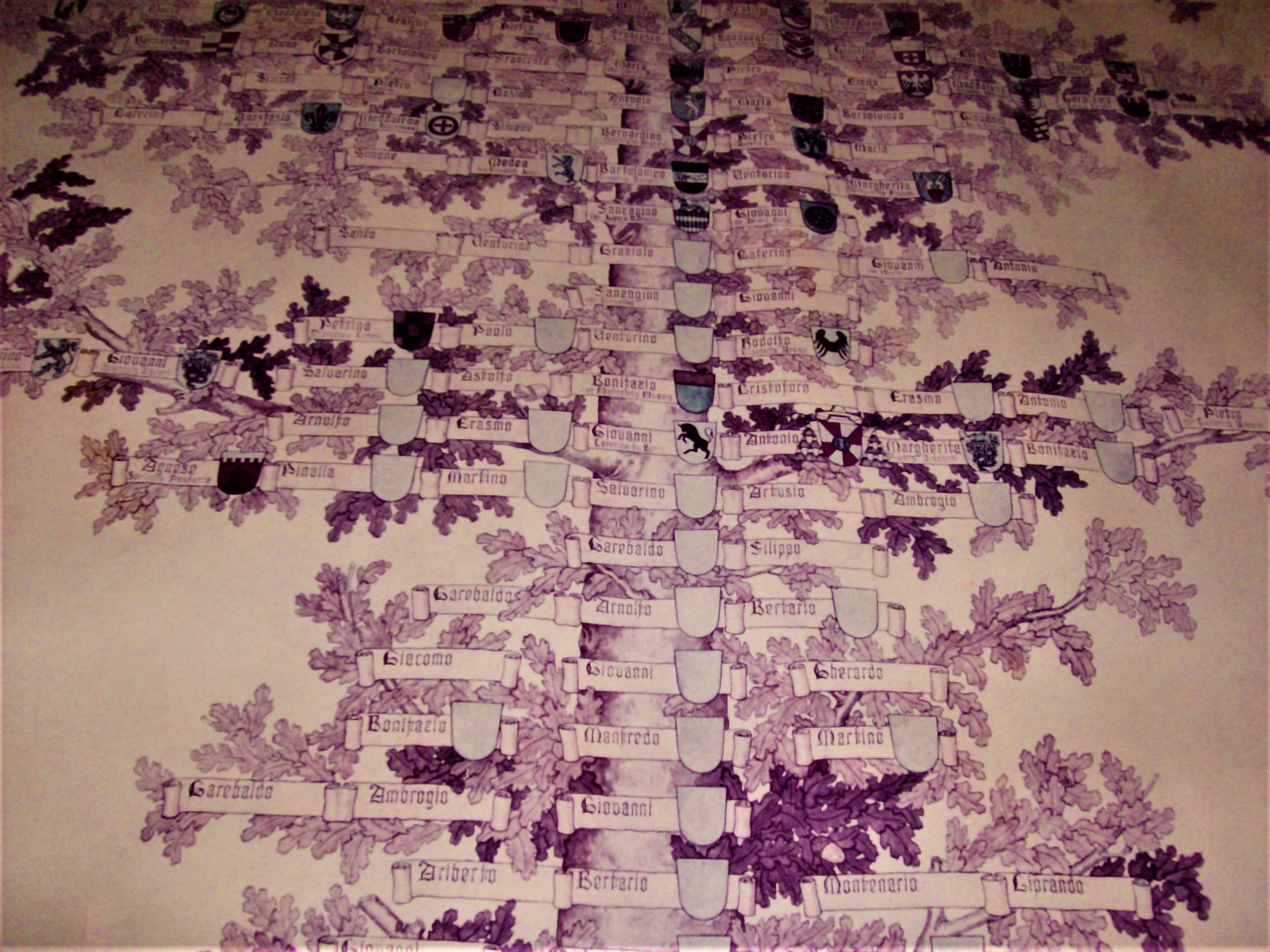
Genealogy of the house of Aliprandi Fanzago where figure Pinalla Aliprandi

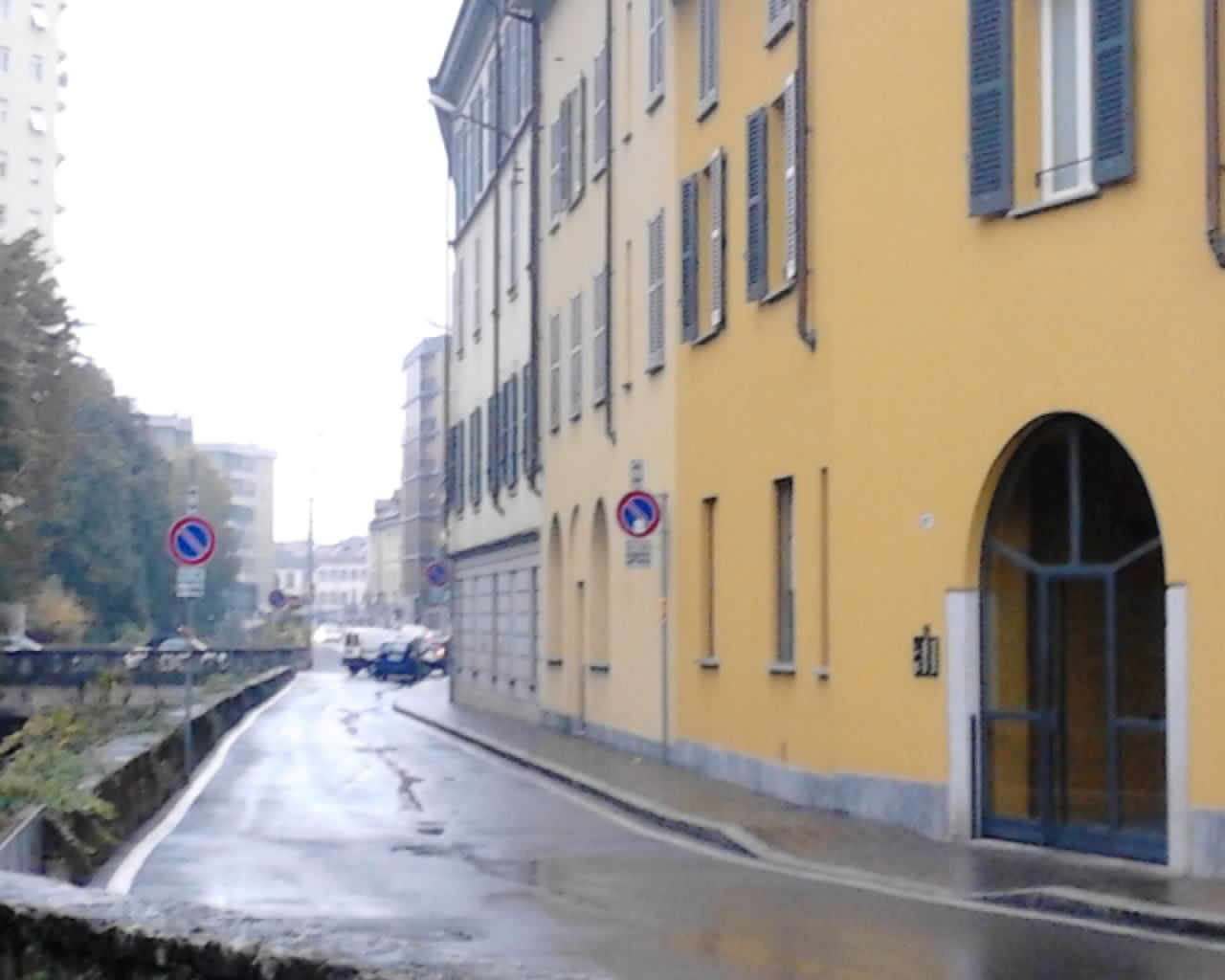
Via Aliprandi in Monza

Born in Monza, son of Rebaldo, brother of Martino and Salvarino, took to entering military career in the army of Azzone Visconti. Belonged to one of the most important families of Monza, but residing in Milan. In April 1333 led to the rescue of six hundred infantry of Ferrara, besieged by the papal legate Bertrando del Poggetto, and on 14 of the month, along with troops from Verona, Gonzaga and Florence, defeated the Papal army. In the same year he was mayor of Bergamo. In 1336, again at the head of an army of Azzone, ravaged the lands around Piacenza and participated in the siege of the city, which capitulated in the hands of the Visconti. In 1339, when Lodrisio Visconti made against Milan, Pinalla, as captain general of the army of Azzone, made against the five hundred horses, but failed to arrest the passage of the Adda, in Parabiago, February 21, the decisive battle took place, ended with the victory of the army of Azzone's fortunes. After the death of Azzone (August 16, 1339), Pinalla was taken aside by Luchino Visconti and in 1341 became part of the conspiracy against him by Pusterla and other noble Milanese. Discovery of the conspiracy, Pinalla, along with his brother Martino, was arrested, tortured and starved to death.

== See also ==
- Aliprandi
