= San Giovanni Battista, Penne =

Coordinates: 42.457203°N 13.928702°E

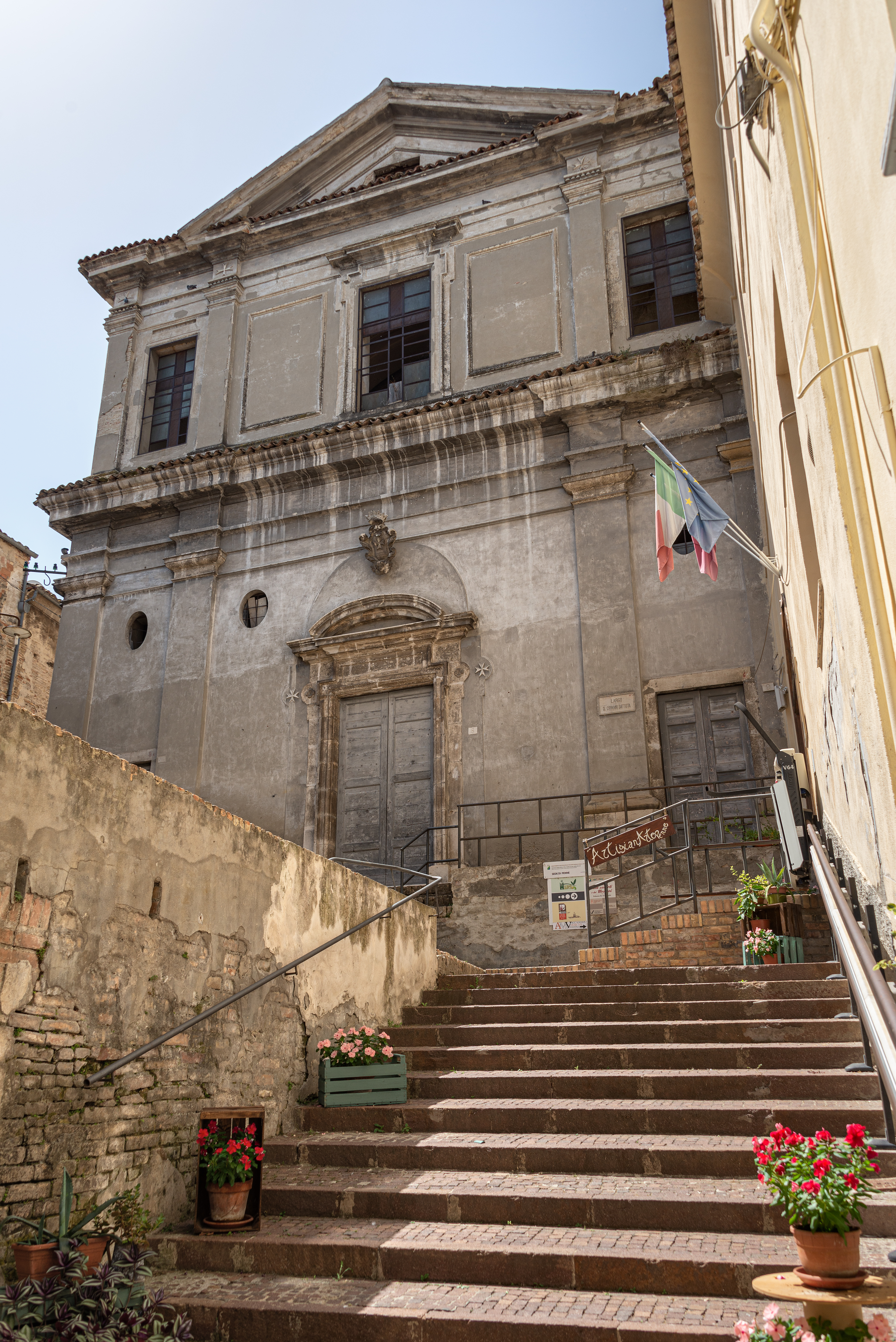
San Giovanni Battista facade

San Giovanni Battista is a Renaissance-style Roman Catholic parish church located in Largo San Domenico near Corso dei Vestini, in the historic center of the town of Penne, region of Abruzzo, Italy. The church is accessible only through stairs along a narrow alley.

== History and description ==
After the conquest of Jerusalem by Saladin in 1187, the female order of cloistered nuns associated with the Knights of Malta relocated to Penne under the patronage of the Trasmundi family. Initially associated with a hospital or hospice located outside the city walls, their convent was destroyed in 1440s and in 1523, they were awarded inside the city and built a monastery and church at this site, completed only in 1700 under the prioress Maria Anna Lanuti di Chieti, as documented in an inscription. The monastery, which stands west of the church, was suppressed in the second half of the 19th century.

The main portal of the church has a coat of arms and is flanked by crosses associated with the Knights of Malta. The design has been attributed to the Lombard architect and artist Giovanni Battista Gianni, who also attributed the stucco decoration of the church of San Domenico, Penne. The layout of the church is unusual since it matches a centralized Greek cross with three chapels, The interior is lit through three large rectangular windows in the façade.

The interiors need restoration and have an elaborate but dilapidated Baroque-style stucco decoration with statues and painted polychrome columns in imitation of marble. The altars are flanked by statues of Saints Ursula, Catherine of Alexandria, Lucy, Margaret of Cortona, Blaise, and Liborius. The walls had been frescoed by Giovanni Battista Gamba. Two Gamba altarpieces are now in the town's diocesan museum. The church once housed a canvas depicting St John in Glory (1617) by Samberlotti di Montorio.
