= Penne, Abruzzo =

Penne Pònne (Neapolitan)
- Comune
- Comune di Penne
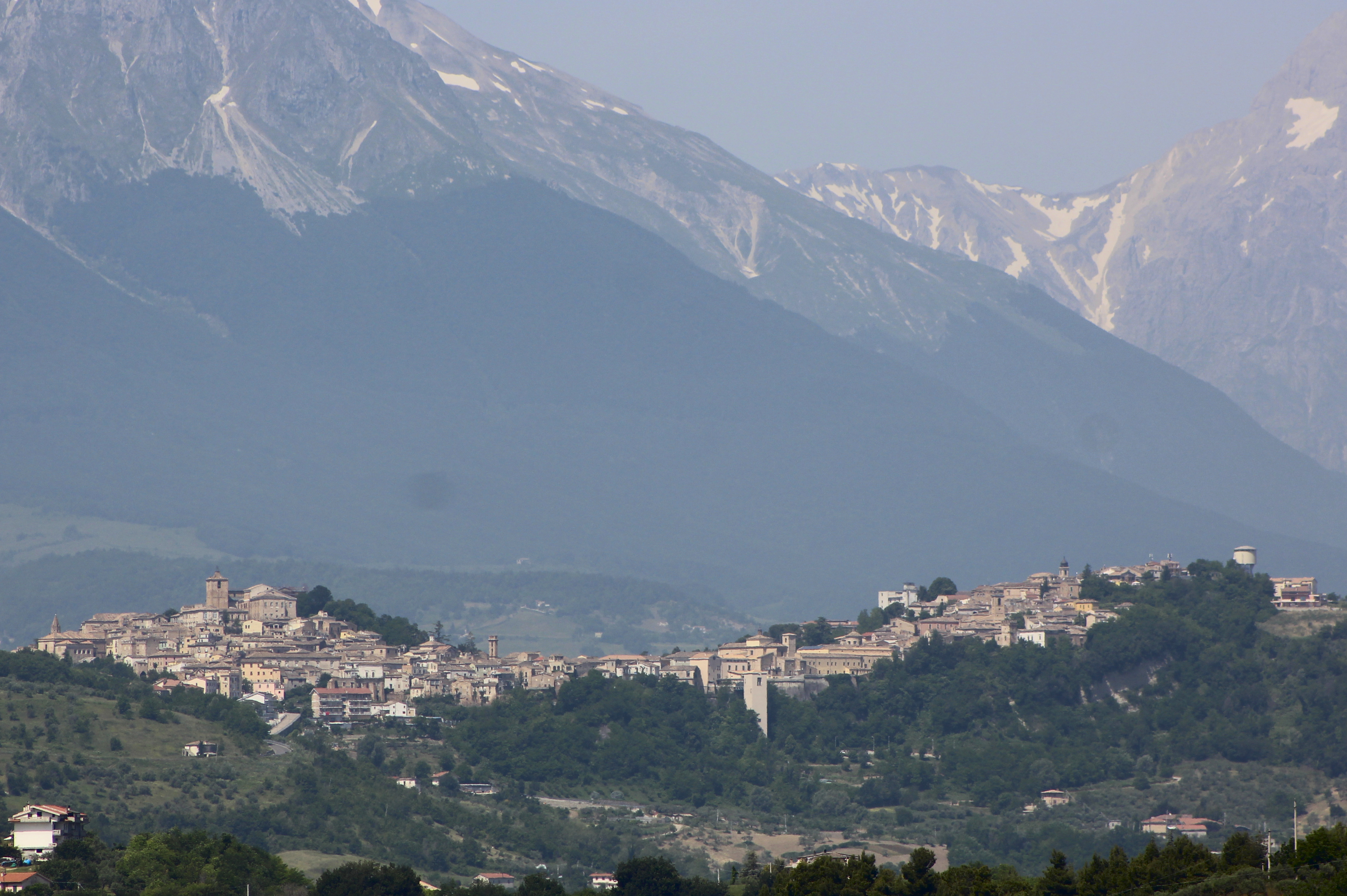
- View of Penne

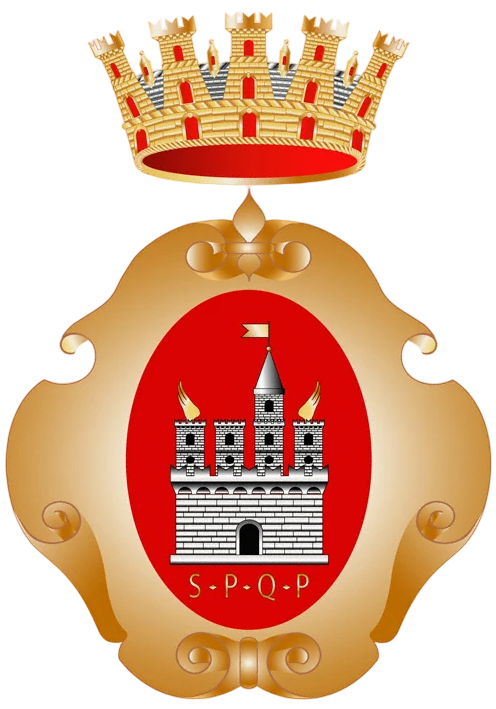
- Coat of arms

- Location within Italy Location within Abruzzo
- Coordinates: 42°27′N 13°55′E
- Country: Italy
- Region: Abruzzo
- Province: Pescara (PE)
- Frazioni: Baricelle, Casale, Collalto, Colle d'Omero, Colle Formica, Colle Maggio, Colle San Giovanni, Colle Sant'Angelo, Colle Stella, Colletrotta, Conaprato, Mallo, Pagliari, Ponte Sant'Antonio, Porta Caldaia, Roccafinadamo, San Pellegrino, Serpacchio, Teto, Villa Degna

Government
  - Mayor: Gilberto Petrucci

Area
  - Total: 91 km^{2} (35 sq mi)
- Elevation: 438 m (1,437 ft)

Population (November 30, 2014)
  - Total: 12,451
  - Density: 140/km^{2} (350/sq mi)
- Demonym: Pennesi
- Time zone: UTC+1 (CET)
  - Summer (DST): UTC+2 (CEST)
- Postal code: 65017
- Dialing code: 085
- Patron saint: St. Maximus
- Saint day: May 7
- Website: Official website

Penne (Italian pronunciation: [ˈpenne], locally [ˈpɛnne]; Pònne in the local dialect) is an Italian town in the province of Pescara, in the Abruzzo region, in mid-southern Italy. According to the last census in 2014 the population was 12,451. It is one of I Borghi più belli d'Italia ("The most beautiful villages of Italy").

Penne is today among the most important towns in the Vestini area, sitting in the hills between the Apennine Mountains and the Adriatic Sea and opening the way for the National Park of Gran Sasso and Monti della Laga through the Regional Natural Reserve "Lake of Penne".

The closest airport is Abruzzo Airport, which is 19 mile drive. The closest beach is Montesilvano, which is 17.5 miles drive. The closest train station is the Pescara Centrale railway station, which is 20.5 miles away. The main medical center is Presidio Ospedaliero Penne.

The widespread use of bricks in every historical building and paving gave Penne the appellation of "Città del mattone", i.e. the "Town of Bricks". In 2006, Penne was awarded the Silver Medal of Civic Merit for events suffered during World War II.

The economy of Penne is driven mainly by tourism, agriculture, the regional hospital and Brioni, the Italian fashion house whose suits are still hand sewn by Pennese women.

In November 2017, Penne was chosen as the starting point for Stage 10 of the 2018 Giro d'Italia. Cyclists left from Penne and climbed to Rigopiano and then beyond to Umbria.

== History ==
The town is ancient, having been occupied from at least the mid-Neolithic period. It was a seat of government of the Vestini people no later than 300 BC. In around 89 BC, the Vestini along with other Italic tribes were defeated by the Romans in the Social War, and became citizens of Rome. The town was known as Pinna Vestinorum during the time of the Roman Republic.

In the Middle Ages, Penne was under the control of the Lombards as part of the Duchy of Spoleto. Starting around 1130 Penne became part of the Kingdom of Sicily. In 1538 the town was given by emperor Charles V, Holy Roman Emperor to his daughter Margaret of Parma as a gift for her wedding to Ottavio Farnese. Under Margaret, Penne became important as a center of power in the Abruzzo region, and many fine palaces and civic structures were erected during this time.

== Geography ==
Penne is a town on the Adriatic side of the Abruzzo region, sitting on several hills between the valleys of the Tavo and Fino rivers. Penne covers an area measuring about 91.20 km^{2}. It is 31 km from Pescara, 35 km from Chieti; and 67 km from Teramo.

=== Climate ===
Penne benefits from the moderating effects of the nearby Adriatic sea (only 20 km away from the town; as the crow flies) but at the same time its weather is influenced by the Gran Sasso mountain chain. According to the climatic data collected during the period 1961-1990, the average temperature of the coldest month, i.e. January, is +5,6 °C where the minimums are about 2-3 °C while the maximums about 9-11 °C; in the hottest month, August, the average temperature is +24,7 °C where the minimums are about 19 °C, while the maximums 30 °C. The climate is therefore characterized by hot summers and rather mild winters, where the annual thermal excursion is anyway lower than 21 °C like in the coast. However, in winter snow and frosts might happen when cold currents from the Balkans or the northern Europe irrupt on the Adriatic coast. During these episodes, minimal temperatures can fall down to -5 °C. Precipitation levels are on average about 845 mm per year according to the climatic data collected during the period 1951 - 2009 and are generally higher than the ones observed in other hillside cities in the sea-side of Abruzzo (around 600–700 mm per year). The climate in Penne can be therefore considered as Mediterranean due to the beneficial influence of the Adriatic sea on the temperatures. However, from a pluviometric stand-point, the town's weather sits in the borderline in between a subtropical humid and Mediterranean weather. In summertime, precipitation is uncommon and mainly occurs in the form of thunderstorms.

Climate data for Penne, elevation 438 m (1,437 ft), (1951–2000)
Month	Jan	Feb	Mar	Apr	May	Jun	Jul	Aug	Sep	Oct	Nov	Dec	Year
Record high °C (°F)	22.0 (71.6)	24.0 (75.2)	27.2 (81.0)	31.0 (87.8)	34.0 (93.2)	38.2 (100.8)	39.7 (103.5)	40.5 (104.9)	36.0 (96.8)	31.6 (88.9)	28.1 (82.6)	24.0 (75.2)	40.5 (104.9)
Mean daily maximum °C (°F)	9.5 (49.1)	10.6 (51.1)	13.3 (55.9)	17.2 (63.0)	21.8 (71.2)	26.0 (78.8)	29.1 (84.4)	29.1 (84.4)	25.0 (77.0)	19.5 (67.1)	14.0 (57.2)	10.6 (51.1)	18.8 (65.9)
Daily mean °C (°F)	6.3 (43.3)	7.1 (44.8)	9.5 (49.1)	12.9 (55.2)	17.4 (63.3)	21.3 (70.3)	24.1 (75.4)	24.1 (75.4)	20.5 (68.9)	15.7 (60.3)	10.8 (51.4)	7.6 (45.7)	14.8 (58.6)
Mean daily minimum °C (°F)	3.2 (37.8)	3.6 (38.5)	5.7 (42.3)	8.7 (47.7)	12.9 (55.2)	16.6 (61.9)	19.1 (66.4)	19.1 (66.4)	16.1 (61.0)	11.9 (53.4)	7.7 (45.9)	4.6 (40.3)	10.8 (51.4)
Record low °C (°F)	−9.5 (14.9)	−8.5 (16.7)	−6.6 (20.1)	−1.1 (30.0)	3.0 (37.4)	6.4 (43.5)	9.0 (48.2)	8.1 (46.6)	4.9 (40.8)	1.2 (34.2)	−2.0 (28.4)	−7.0 (19.4)	−9.5 (14.9)
Average precipitation mm (inches)	64.7 (2.55)	59.5 (2.34)	71.6 (2.82)	77.3 (3.04)	59.6 (2.35)	68.2 (2.69)	52.8 (2.08)	59.6 (2.35)	68.0 (2.68)	87.2 (3.43)	89.8 (3.54)	80.3 (3.16)	838.6 (33.03)
Average precipitation days	7	7	8	8	7	7	5	5	6	8	8	9	85
Source: Regione Abruzzo

== Main sights ==
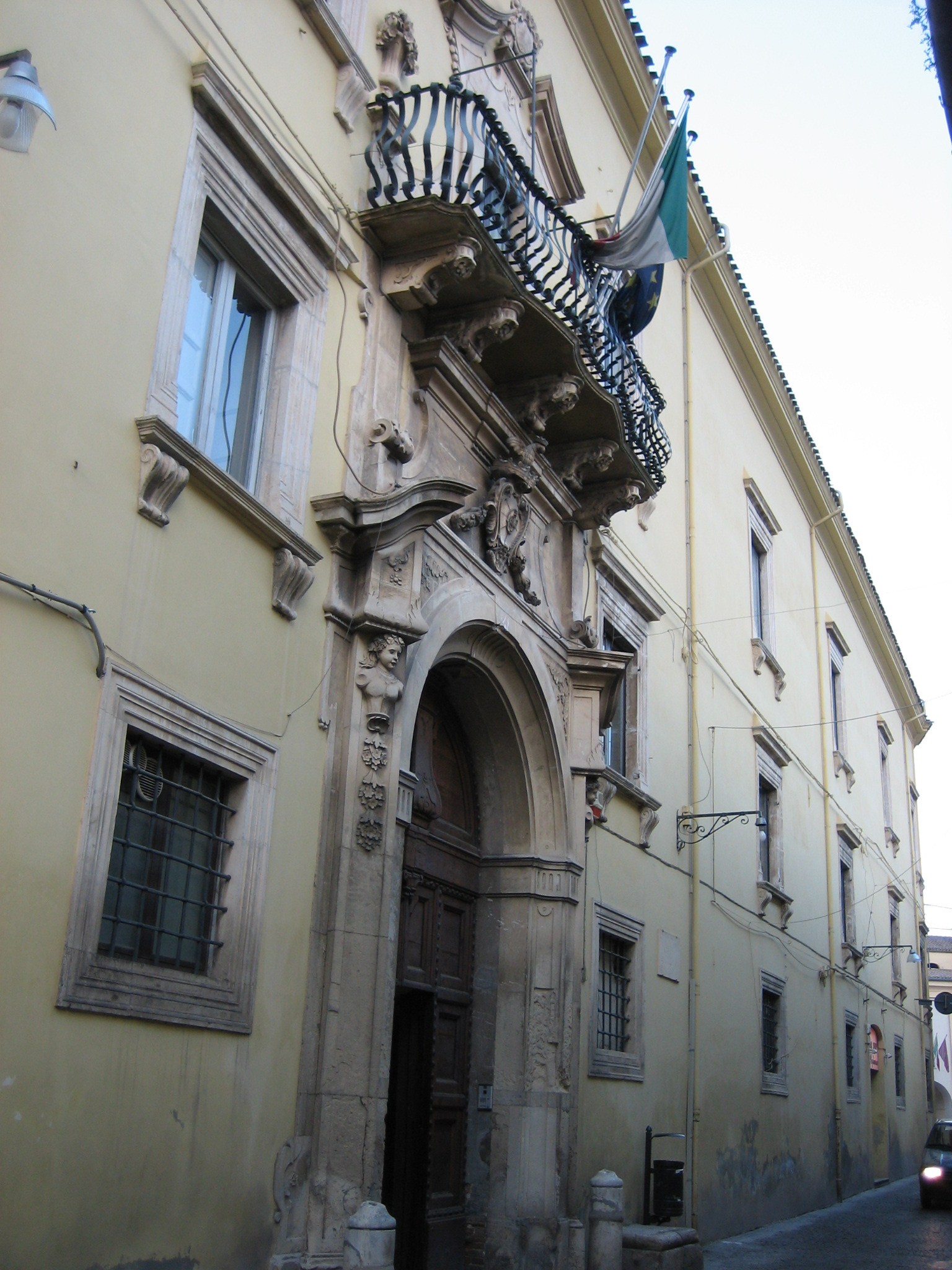
Aliprandi Palace

The main characteristic of the old town is its streets and houses are built in bricks, so in the past Penne was known as "the small Siena".

Penne's churches include the 12th-century church of Santa Maria in Colleromano, and the Duomo, which now houses the Diocese Museum including a crypt dating from the 8th century. Other churches include Sant'Agostino (with a historical bell-tower), San Giovanni Battista, San Giovanni Evangelista, Annunziata, Madonna del Carmine, San Nicola, San Domenico.

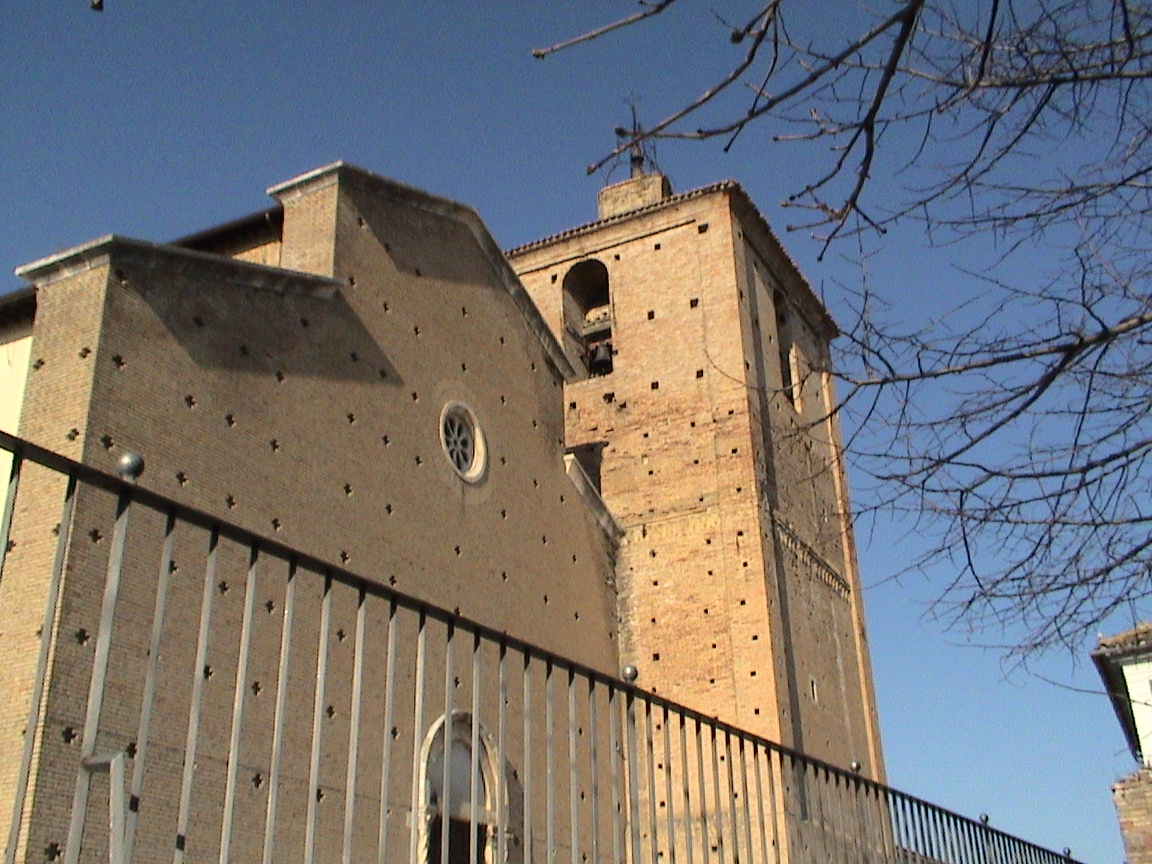
Dome of Penne

=== Notable religious structures ===
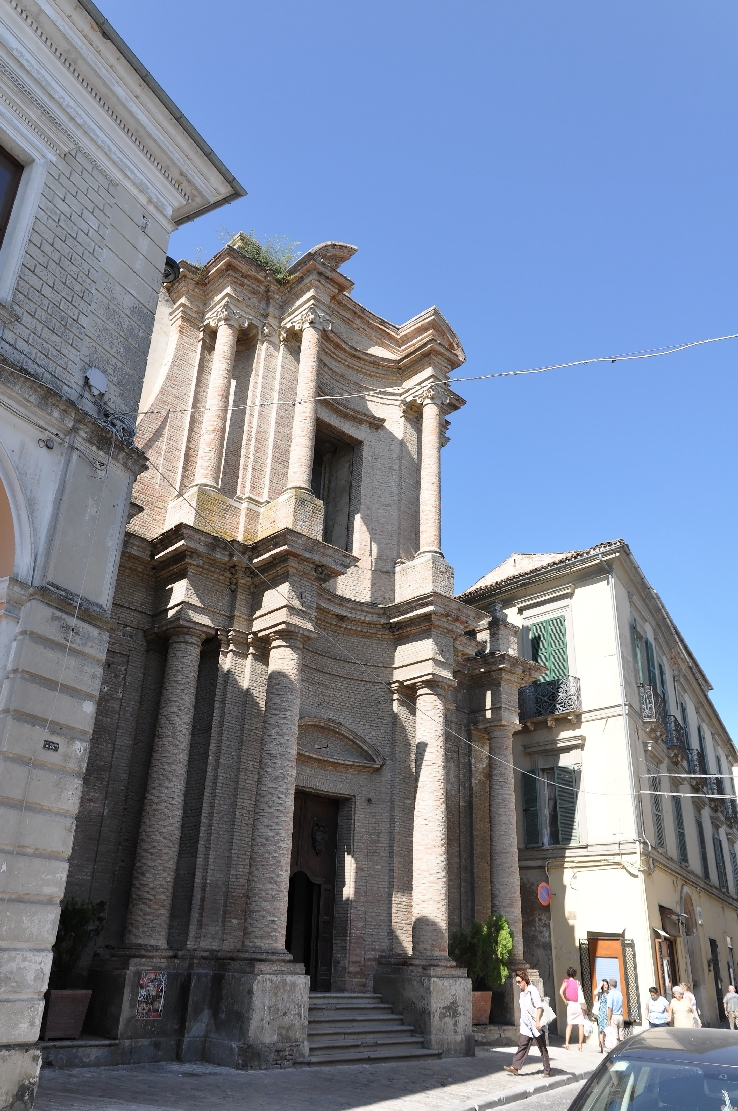
SS. Annunziata's Church

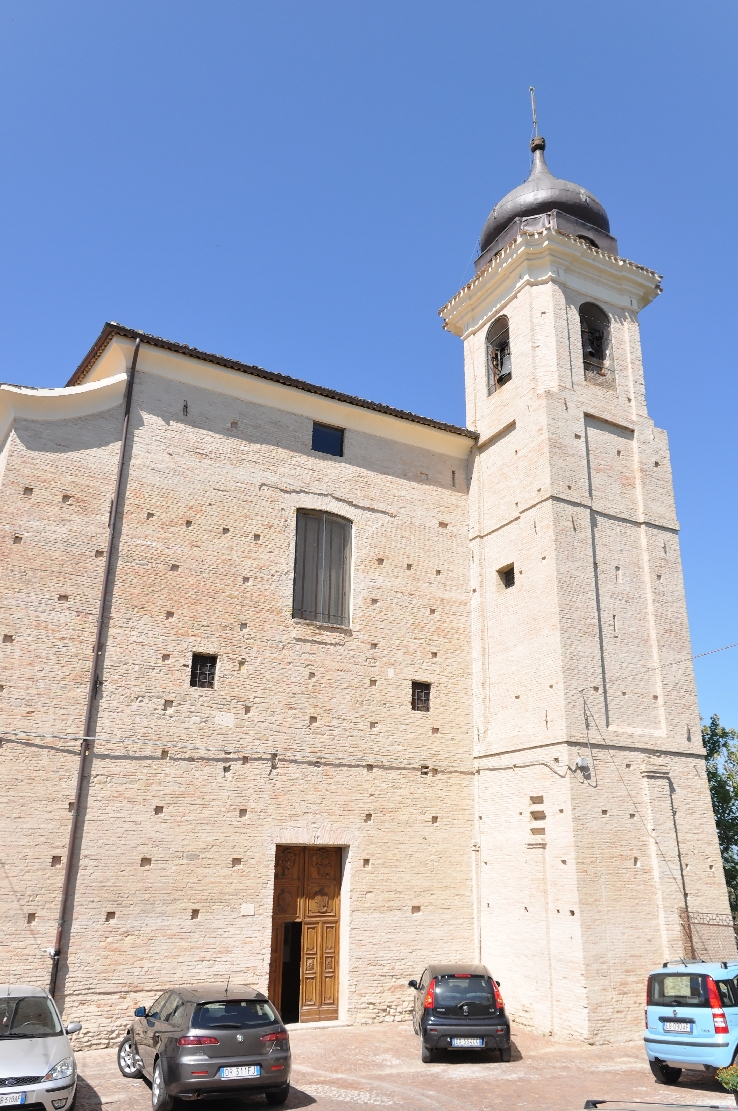
Santa Chiara's Church

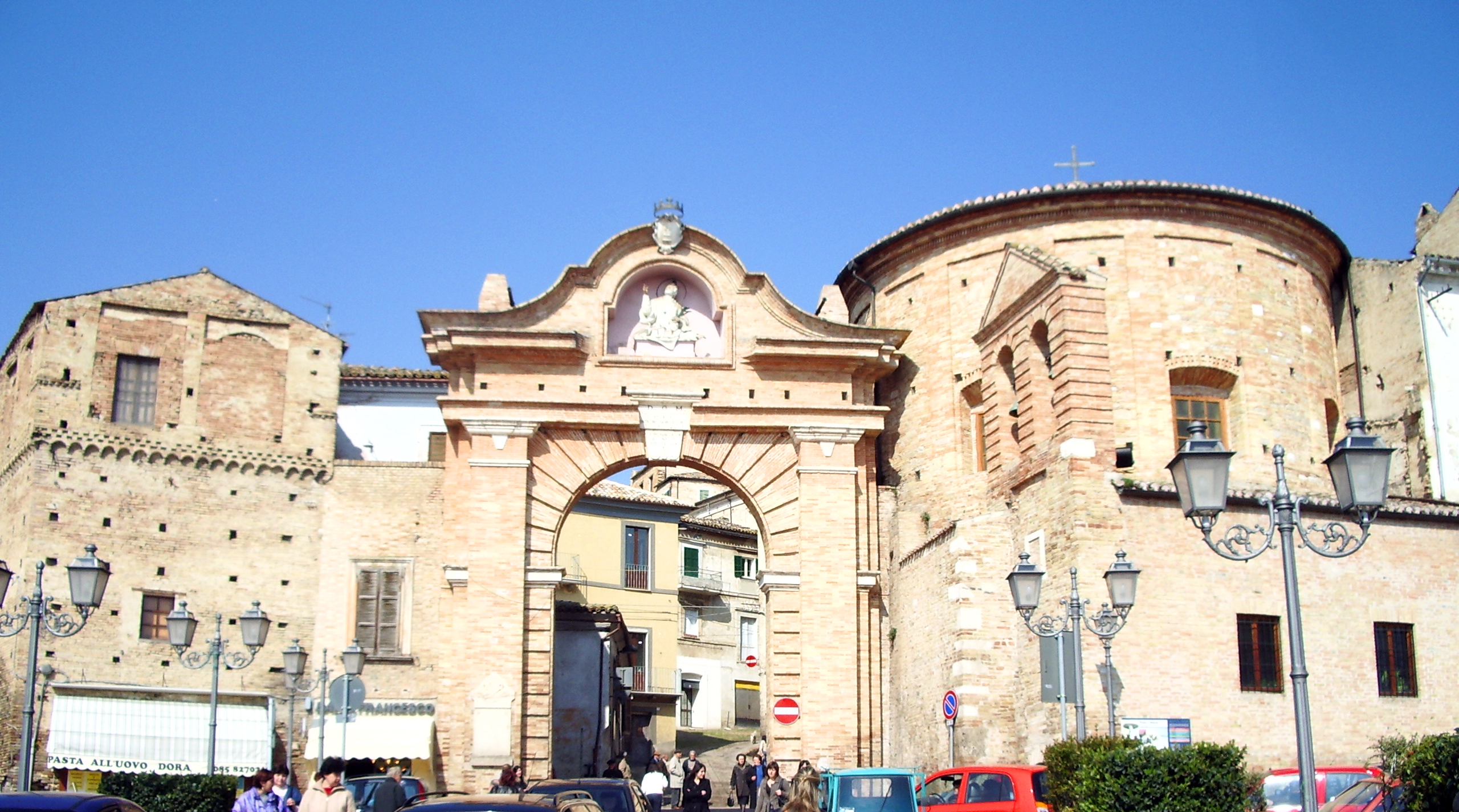
San Francesco's gate

- Duomo (Cathedral) of Penne, also known as Chiesa di San Massimo (Church of Saint Massimo). A concathedral of Pescara-Penne archdiocese, it was built after St Maximus of Aveia on a 10th-century Crypt. Probably the Crypt was erected on an ancient temple dedicated to the goddess Vesta. The cathedral was heavily damaged during aerial bombardment in 1944 and was restored in 1955.
- Santa Croce: Holy Cross church characterized by a facade showing the symbols of the "Passion of Christ", installed by the Passionists in the 19th century.
- Church of Santa Chiara: built in the 17th century next to the ancient Church of the Holy Spirit. Characterized by a Greek cross plan, it was entirely renovated in 1702 AD. The Cupola shows a beautiful fresco by the "pennese" painter Domiziano Vallarola. Next to the church, there is the Clarisse nuns convent which has been included in the St Maximus Hospital in 1912.
- Church of San Ciro: erected in the second half of the 18th century and renovated in 1843 by the priest Quintangeli. It now belongs to the "Holy Family" nuns.
- Collegiata of San Giovanni Evangelista: There are documents proving the existence of this Church since 1324. It has two magnificent stone portals: the main one from 1604, the lateral one from 1594. The lombard style bell tower was built during renaissance.
- Church of Sant'Antonio di Padova: chapel of the family Aliprandi of 1648. Stone portal characterized by a diamond tip pattern.
- San Domenico, Penne, Abruzzo: facade with a portal from 1667 and a sculpture representing "The Virgin with her Son" from 1400. The Church has a baroque style with a marvelous Chorus made of walnut wood from the 17th century and an organ from the 18th century. The lateral altars show some paintings by the brothers Ragazzini as well as a few remains of Giottesque frescos. Attached to the church is the seventeenth-century Chapel of the Rosary with a magnificent ceiling. The cloister was built in 1330. Inside the church there is a civic lapidary as well as a statue of St. Blaise by Capro De Matteo.
- Santissima Annunziata: Although the church has Romanesque origins, the interior style is baroque. Of great importance is the facade, 1801, called one of the most beautiful pages of the Baroque Abruzzo. The "vela" style bell tower was designed by the engineer F. Dottorelli.
- San Giovanni Battista, of Order of the Knights of Malta. Facade of 1701. Plant Central. Stucco Pitch. In the adjacent former convent there were the Dames of Malta.
- Sant'Agostino: and adjacent Oratory of Our Lady of the Belt. The church houses the fourteenth-century fresco of the Crucifixion . The bell tower, built in the '400 according to "Atri" style, presents an exquisite polychrome decoration in majolica.
- Santa Maria del Carmine: (also known as Madonna del Carmine ) with the adjacent convent of the Carmelites, used until 1979 as the district prison. The facade was made from the "pennese" Aniello Francia.
- Convent of Santa Maria in Colleromano . Born as a stronghold Cistercian in 1197, the monastery is situated on the so-called "Roman Hill" (Colleromano). Of particular interest are the stone portal, the art gallery and library, equipped with precious codes.
- Convent of the Nativity of Mary Ss.ma. The monastery of the Capuchin Friars is located on the "Cappuccio Hill", just outside the main old town of Penne. The church owns a tabernacle, altar and other ornaments of valuable wood.

=== Notable civic structures ===
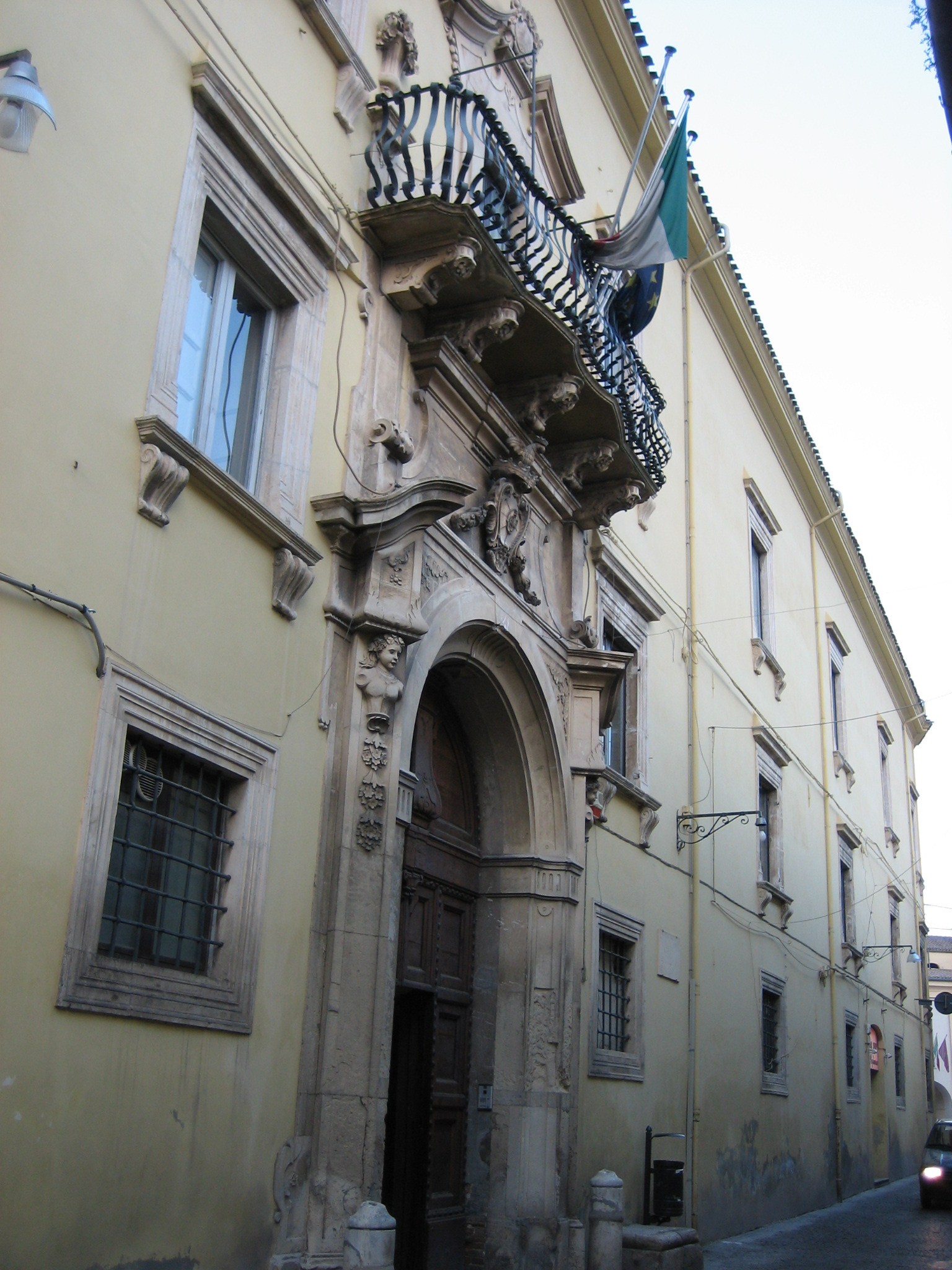
Aliprandi's Palace facade

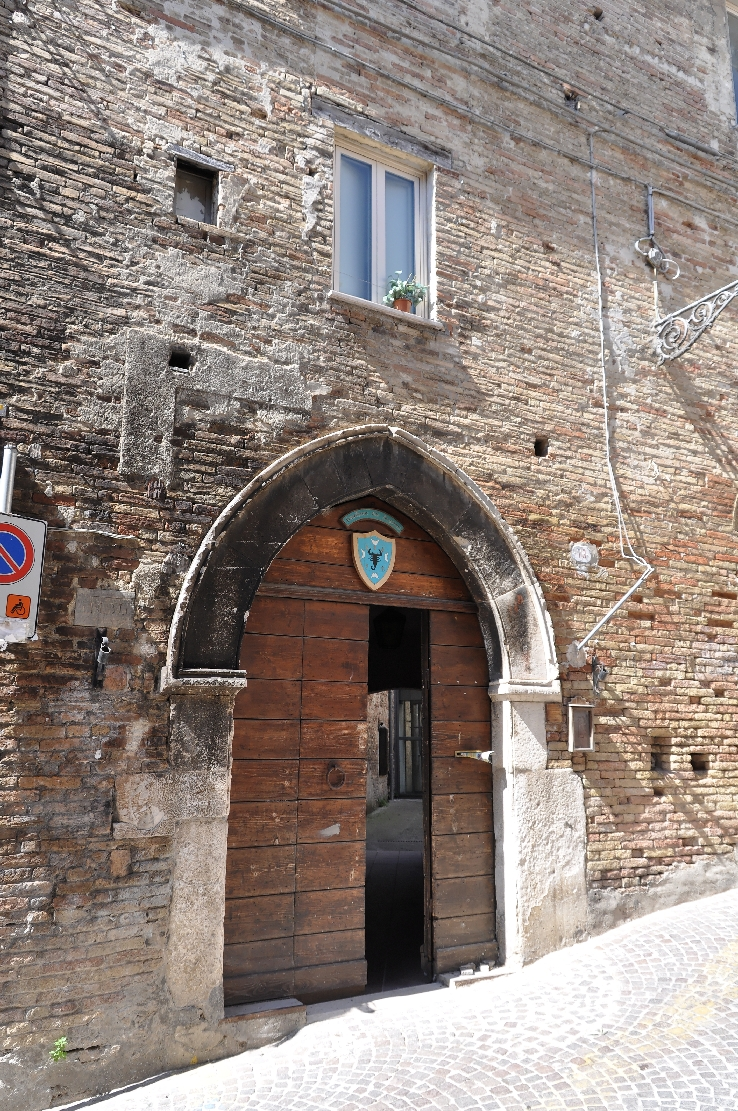
Medieval stone portal of a palace in Penne

Gates

- Porta San Francesco : rebuilt in 1780 and designed by architect Di Sio, homing a sculpture of St Maximus, patron of the city. It constitutes together with the surrounding buildings a monumental entrance to the town.
- Porta da Capo : also known as Santa Croce or Porta Teramo. It is characterized by a medieval stone pointed arch. On its right there is a stone dated 1523.
- Porta della Ringa : the ancient port of 'Arengo. Rebuilt in 1832 by Baron Diego Aliprandi.
- Porta dei Coinci : subsequently called Porta dei Ferrari or simply Portella . Pointed arch in stone from the 14th century.

Palaces

- Palazzo De Dura : Renaissance facade brick.
- Palazzo Scorpio : former home of Margaret of Austria, Duchess of Penne. Renaissance courtyard of brick, with columns and cubic capitals.
- Palazzo Stefanucci : home of Stefanucci originating in Florence, then inhabited by the De Torres. Facade and portal of the seventeenth century. In the nineteenth century wing it was inhabited by Dottorelli.
- Palazzo del giustiziere ("Palace of executioner"): it was the seat of the executioner of 'Abruzzo Ultra in 1400 . The Renaissance building has a valuable brick facade. The string course is the element of relationship with crenellations, now modified by a subsequent cover.
- Palazzo Aliprandi : Stately building of the seventeenth century. The stone doorway on Via Martiri Pennesi was made by De Cicco in 1773.
- Palazzo di Teseo Castiglione : restoration of a medieval building designed by the architect Di Sio (1766). Baroque façade with two tiers of loggias. Clock majolica by Antonio Pope (1770).
- Cortiletto medievale : in the alley of remittances. Example of local architecture, the yard consists of two rows of columns with cubic capitals.
- Porches Salconio : they were built in 1911 and designed by the engineer Ciulli. In 1929 they were named after John Salconio Cola, historian from Penne of the sixteenth century.

=== Other notable structures ===
- Piazzetta di S. Croce: It is a little square on the top of the "Colle Castello".
- Piazzetta XX Settembre: It is a square built in 1842 and designed by the engineer Federico Dottorelli. In the middle of the square there is a monument for the Martyrs of Penne of 1837, built in 1913 by the artist Pasquale Morgante from Teramo.
- Viale San Francesco (St Francis' boulevard). It is part of the monumental entrance of the town, lined by bars, shops and public gardens.

== Other Point of Interest ==
- Orto Botanico Riserva Lago di Penne

== See also ==
- Roman Catholic Archdiocese of Pescara-Penne
