= Estorre Visconti =

Italian noble (1346 – 1413)

- Born: 1346; Milan, Italy
- Died: 1413 January 7 Monza, Italy
- Other names: Ettore, Astorre
- Occupations: Military and Civil leader

Coat of arms of the House of Visconti

Estorre Visconti, or Astorre (1346 – 7 January 1413) was one of the many illegitimate sons of the famous Bernabò Visconti, Lord of Milan, who was deposed by his nephew Gian Galeazzo Visconti in 1385.

== Life ==
Estorre, alternately spelled Ettore or Astorre was born in 1346, the son of Bernabò Visconti and Beltramola de'Grassi. He was born during his father's exile from Milan for conspiring against his uncle Luchino. When Giovanni Visconti ended his nephew's exile sometime around 1347-1349, it is likely that on his return or soon thereafter he brought Beltramola and their children to Milan.

Estorre and his siblings were Bernabò's eldest and only children until 1350 when Bernabò married Beatrice Regina della Scala and started to have legitimate children.

Although Estorre was illegitimate, his father Bernabò (who had numerous children with his wife and mistresses) made use of his illegitimate children to advance himself: he married the daughters off to improve his relationships with mercenary leaders, or condottieri while the sons served as officers in his armies. Accordingly, Estorre undertook a military career where he gained a reputation as a "man without fear".

In 1354, Estorre's father became the co-ruler of Milan together with his brothers Matteo and Galeazzo II. Their rule ended in 1385 when Bernabò was ambushed by his nephew Gian Galeazzo Visconti, who subsequently imprisoned and murdered him. Many of Estorre's siblings were then forced into exile. Around 1403, Estorre appeared in Verona, where his half-brother Carlo Visconti ruled.

By 1407, Estorre proclaimed himself Lord of Monza and began to mint coins with the words Hestor Vicecomes Modoetie. Giovanni Maria Visconti, the son of Gian Galeazzo and the Duke of Milan, accused him of conspiracy and had him imprisoned in the Castle of Monza, where Gian Galeazzo had imprisoned and murdered Estorre's father. Eventually, Estorre was freed by his followers, members of the Ghibelline party.

After the assassination of Giovanni Maria Visconti (16 May 1412), Estorre and his nephew Gian Carlo Visconti were acclaimed as rulers by the people of Milan. Estorre was among the few sons of Bernabò still alive, so his claim joined with that of Gian Carlo, the son of Bernabò's legitimate son Carlo. The pair held on to control until June of that year when they were defeated by his nephew Filippo Maria Visconti, brother of Gian Maria.

Estorre, his sister Valentina, and her husband Giovanni Aliprandi, then fled to Monza, where he was besieged by the Count of Carmagnola. In the courtyard of the castle, while he was watering his horse, a stone thrown at random from a catapult of the besiegers broke his leg, which caused his death in Monza a few days later.

Following renovations in the Duomo of Monza in 1711, his mummified body was found and is in the Museum of the Treasure of the Cathedral of Monza. His sword, the valuable work of an Milanese armourer, is exhibited there.
