= Penne Cathedral =

Church in Penne Abruzzo, Italy

Coordinates: 42.45622°N 13.92682°E

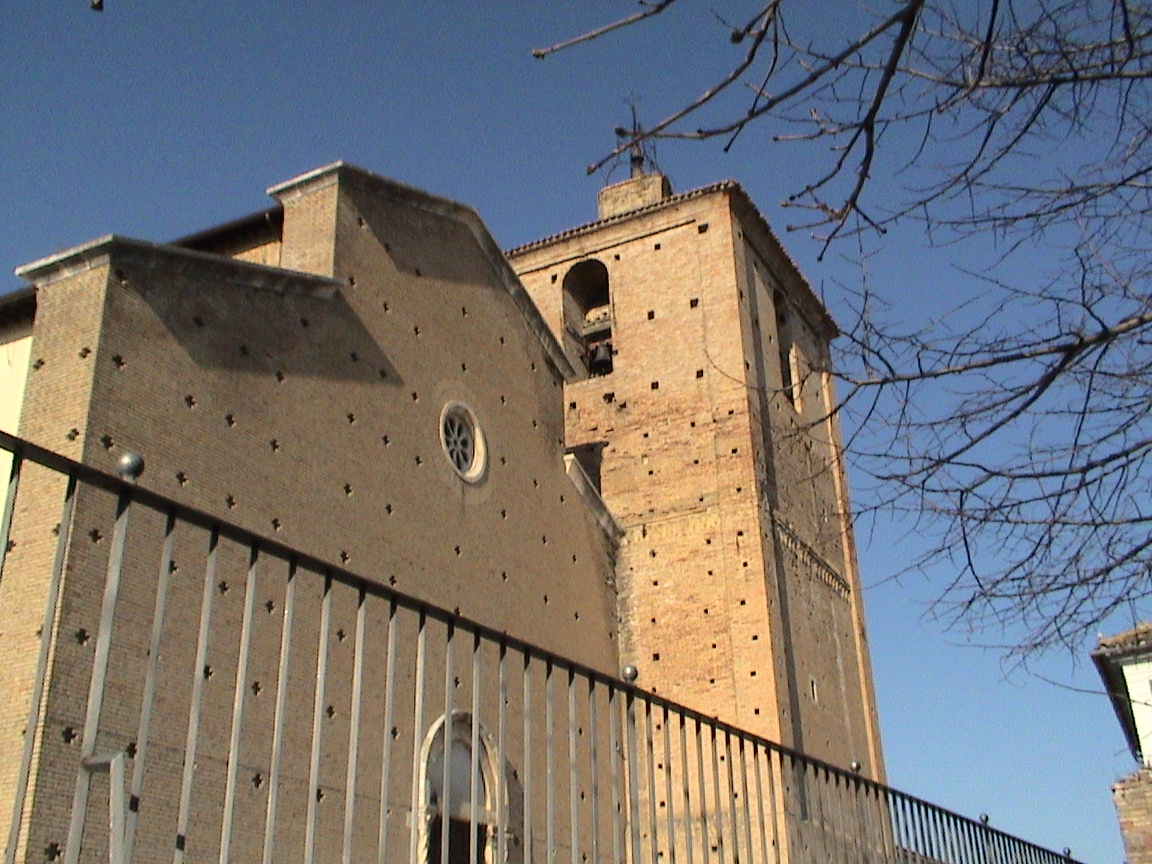
Penne Cathedral

Penne Cathedral (Italian: Duomo di Penne; Concattedrale di San Massimo) is a Roman Catholic cathedral dedicated to Saint Maximus in Penne, Abruzzo, Italy.

Formerly the seat of the Bishops of Penne, it became in 1949 a co-cathedral in the Diocese of Penne-Pescara, now the Archdiocese of Pescara-Penne (since 1982).

== See also ==
- Roman Catholic Archdiocese of Pescara-Penne
