= Giovanni Aliprandi =

Coat of arms of Family Aliprandi

Giovanni Aliprandi (fl. 1386 – 1426) was an Italian nobleman. He was Count Palatine and captain (immediate vassal) of the Holy Roman Empire and lived in Milan, in the parish of San Simpliciano.

== Biography ==
He entered public life in 1386, when he was elected Council Settler for Sestiere Comacina in Milan. A few years later the Duke of Milan wanted him among his advisers. He had also political and military roles outside Milan. In 1403 the City of Piacenza asked him to support before the Duke Gian Galeazzo Visconti the request to set up four teams for the defense of the city, in order to end the power of the Anguissola family.

In 1412, he was appointed Mayor and Captain of the Army of Bologna. When, in the same year, Estorre Visconti was proclaimed Lord of Milan, Giovanni Aliprandi returned home. After Filippo Maria Visconti occupied with troops the city of Milan, Estorre Visconti, his sister Valentina and her husband Giovanni Aliprandi fled to Monza with their allies. Here the resistance was tenacious until Estorre Visconti died and, because of severe food shortage, Valentina Visconti agreed to surrender with honor in the hands of Captain who ran the siege, Francesco Bussone, called Count of Carmagnola.

Nothing is known about Giovanni Aliprandi and his wife and children, for over ten years afterwards. In 1425 they were in Treviso. There lived also the Count of Carmagnola, who had stopped serving the Duke of Milan and was offering his services to the Venetian Republic.

Documents that came to light in 1800, after the end of the Republic of Venice, and those of the Visconti Archive, show that Giovanni Aliprandi conspired to kill the Count of Carmagnola, in hope to convince the Duke of Milan (his cousin) to remove the ban which had affected his family. The conspiracy was revealed, he was arrested and beheaded in 1426.

== See also ==
- Aliprandi
