= Castello De Sterlich-Aliprandi =

Castle in Nocciano, Italy

Coordinates: 42.3333°N 13.9834°E

De Sterlich-Aliprandi Castle
- Castello De Sterlich-Aliprandi
- Nocciano
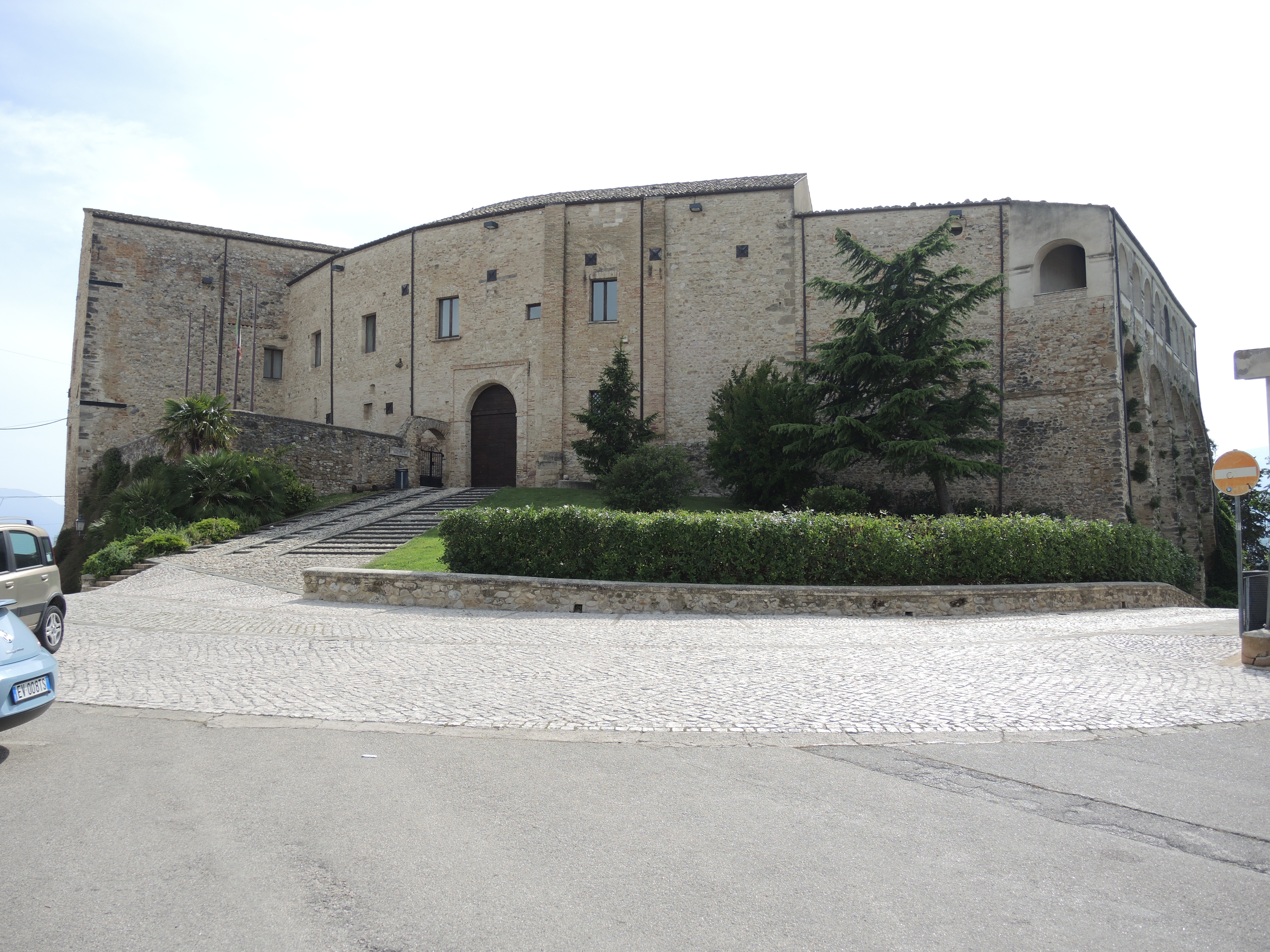
- Castle in Nocciano

Site information
- Type: Castle

Location

Site history
- Built: 15th century

Castello De Sterlich-Aliprandi (Italian for De Sterlich-Aliprandi Castle) is a fortified palace in Nocciano, Province of Pescara (Abruzzo).

== History ==
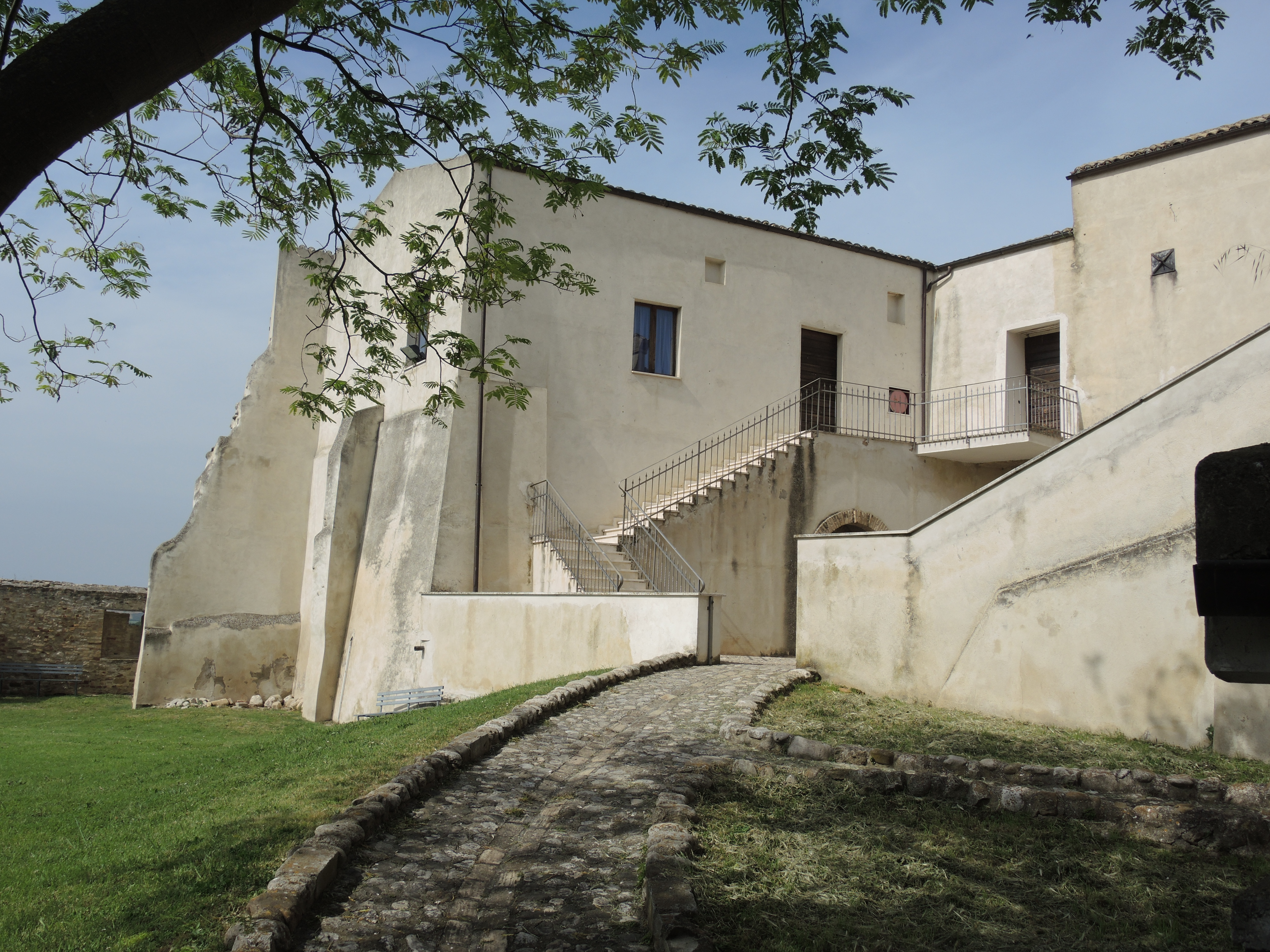
Inner courtyard

Situated between the valleys of Cigno, Pescara, and Nora, the construction of the castle dates back to the year 1000, with the first nucleus consisting of the polygonal tower, which was later incorporated into the current building.

The history of the castle is closely linked to the De Sterlich-Aliprandi family, who were present in Nocciano from the 15th-16th centuries and owned it until the mid-20th century. They transformed its appearance from a defensive structure to a noble residence.

== Architecture ==
The castle has an irregular plan with a structure resembling a double "L". The castle is accessed via a wide ramp that leads to the main entrance, topped by a round arch. Upon entering the castle, one faces a paved courtyard, open on one side towards the garden.

The piano nobile features a loggia with three arches, and another loggia with eight arches can also be found on the exterior wall.
