= Martino Aliprandi =

Coat of arms of Family Aliprandi

Martino Aliprandi (fl. 1334 – 1341) was an Italian lawyer and mayor of the 14th century.

== Biography ==
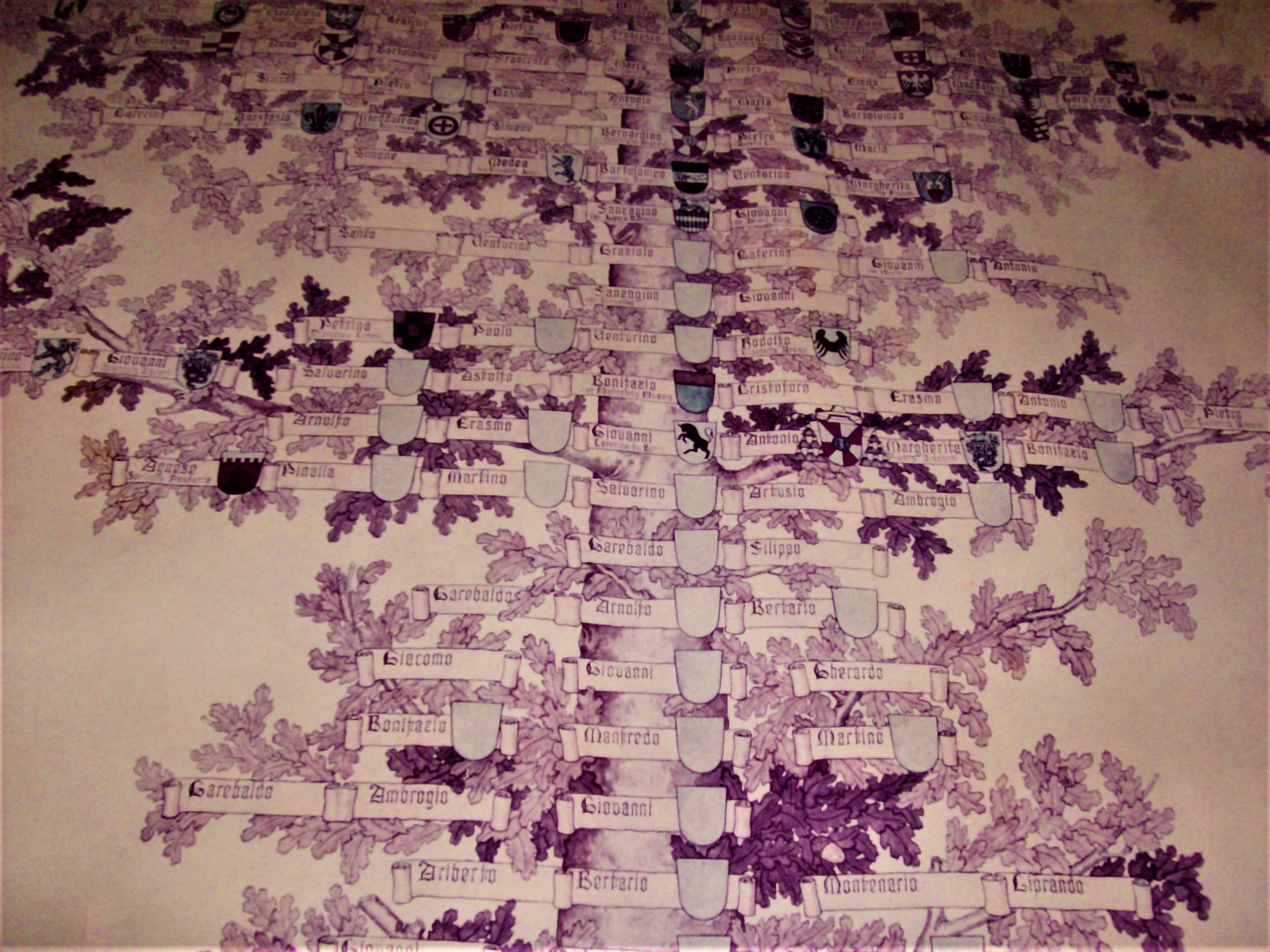
Genealogy of the house of Aliprandi Fanzago where figure Martino Aliprandi

Born in Monza, son of Rebaldo, he belonged to one of the most important families of Monza, but lived in Milan. Brother of Pinalla and Salvarino, he was a lawyer in Milan. He was collaborator of Giovanni and Azzone Visconti, whose diplomatic positions overlaid. He organized in Monza with his brother Pinalla, a victorious resistance against Emperor Louis IV. He was mayor from 1334 to 1336 always at Monza, where oversaw the construction of walls and fortified the castle, and then in 1337–1338 in Piacenza. After the death of Azzone Visconti (16 August 1339) Pinalla Aliprandi was kept in the background by Luchino and became part of the conspiracy against him in 1341 by Pusterla and other noble Milanese. Discovery of the conspiracy, Pinalla, and with him his brother Martino, were arrested, tortured, and starved to death. Martino was buried in the family chapel in the church of San Marco in Milan, his sepulchral ark, which is depicted in the act of lecturing to students of law, is an example of funerary sculpture of the mid-fourteenth century.
