= Giovanni Battista Ragazzini =

Italian painter

Giovanni Battista Ragazzini (c. 1520 - c. 1591) was an Italian painter, active in Ravenna, Fano, and in Umbria. He was born in Ravenna. He painted with his brother Francesco in the church of San Domenico, Fano. His style was influenced by Luca Longhi. A painting of Mary Magdalene is in Santa Maria delle Vergini, Macerata.
