= Tavo (river) =

Location
- Country: Italy

Physical characteristics
- Source
  - location: Gran Sasso d'Italia
- Mouth: Saline
  - coordinates: 42.4843°N 14.0953°E

Basin features
- Progression: Saline→ Adriatic Sea

The Tavo is a river in the Abruzzo region of Italy. Its source is in the Gran Sasso d'Italia mountain range in the province of L'Aquila near the border with the province of Pescara. After crossing the border, the river loops northward and then eastward near Penne. It then flows south and then northeast and flows near Loreto Aprutino and Pianella. The river continues flowing northeast near Cappelle sul Tavo before joining the Fino and together they become the Saline.
