= Nocciano =

Nocci
- Comune
- Comune di Nocci
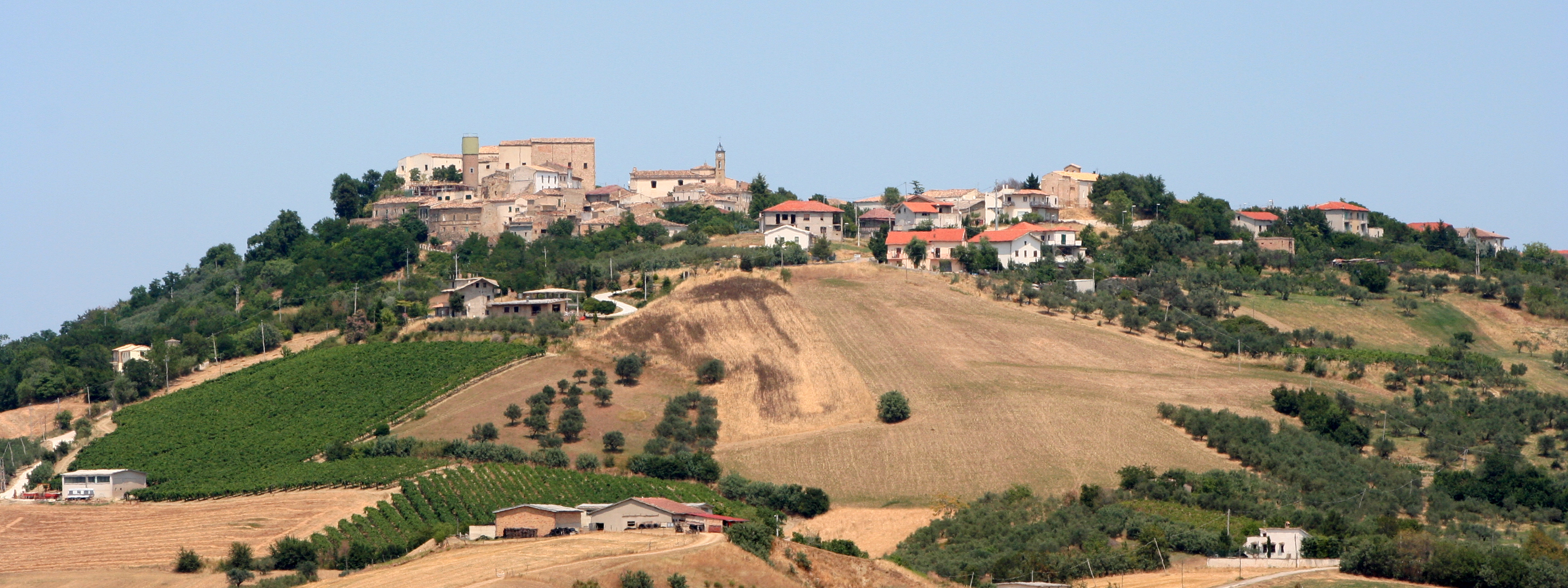
- View of Nocciano

- Location within Italy Location within Abruzzo
- Coordinates: 42°20′N 13°59′E
- Country: Italy
- Region: Abruzzo
- Province: Pescara (PE)
- Frazioni: Casali, Cerasa, Colle May, Collina, Fonteschiavo, Prato San Lorenzo

Area
  - Total: 13 km^{2} (5.0 sq mi)
- Elevation: 301 m (988 ft)

Population (1 January 2007)
  - Total: 1,826
  - Density: 140/km^{2} (360/sq mi)
- Demonym: Noccianesi
- Time zone: UTC+1 (CET)
  - Summer (DST): UTC+2 (CEST)
- Postal code: 65010
- Dialing code: 085
- Patron saint: San Lorenzo
- Saint day: 10 August
- Website: Official website

Nocciano is a comune and town in the Province of Pescara in the Abruzzo region of Italy.

== See also ==
- Castello De Sterlich-Aliprandi
