= Saline (Italian river) =

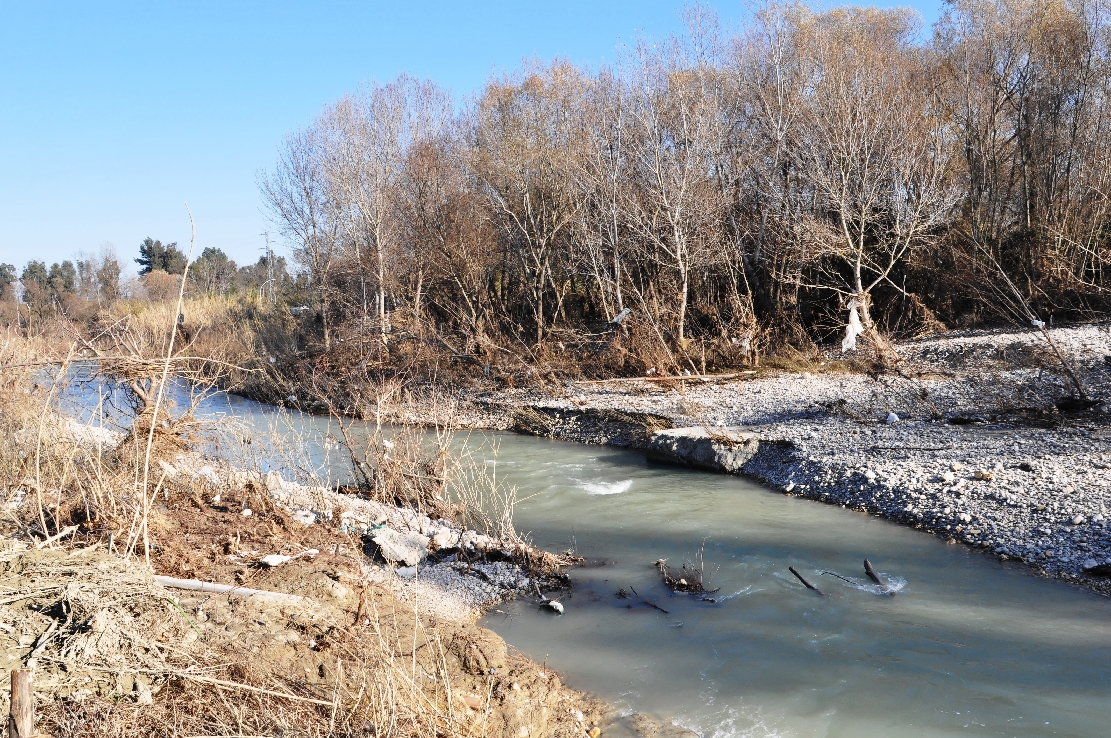

Location
- Country: Italy

Physical characteristics
- Source
  - location: confluence of the Fino and Tavo rivers
- Mouth: Adriatic Sea
  - location: Montesilvano
  - coordinates: 42.5262°N 14.1516°E

The Saline is a river in the province of Pescara in the Abruzzo region of Italy The river is formed by the confluence of the Fino and Tavo rivers. It flows northeast and enters the Adriatic Sea near Montesilvano and Città Sant'Angelo.
