= Santa Maria delle Vergini, Macerata =

Church building in Macerata, Italy

Coordinates: 43°17′35″N 13°28′17″E

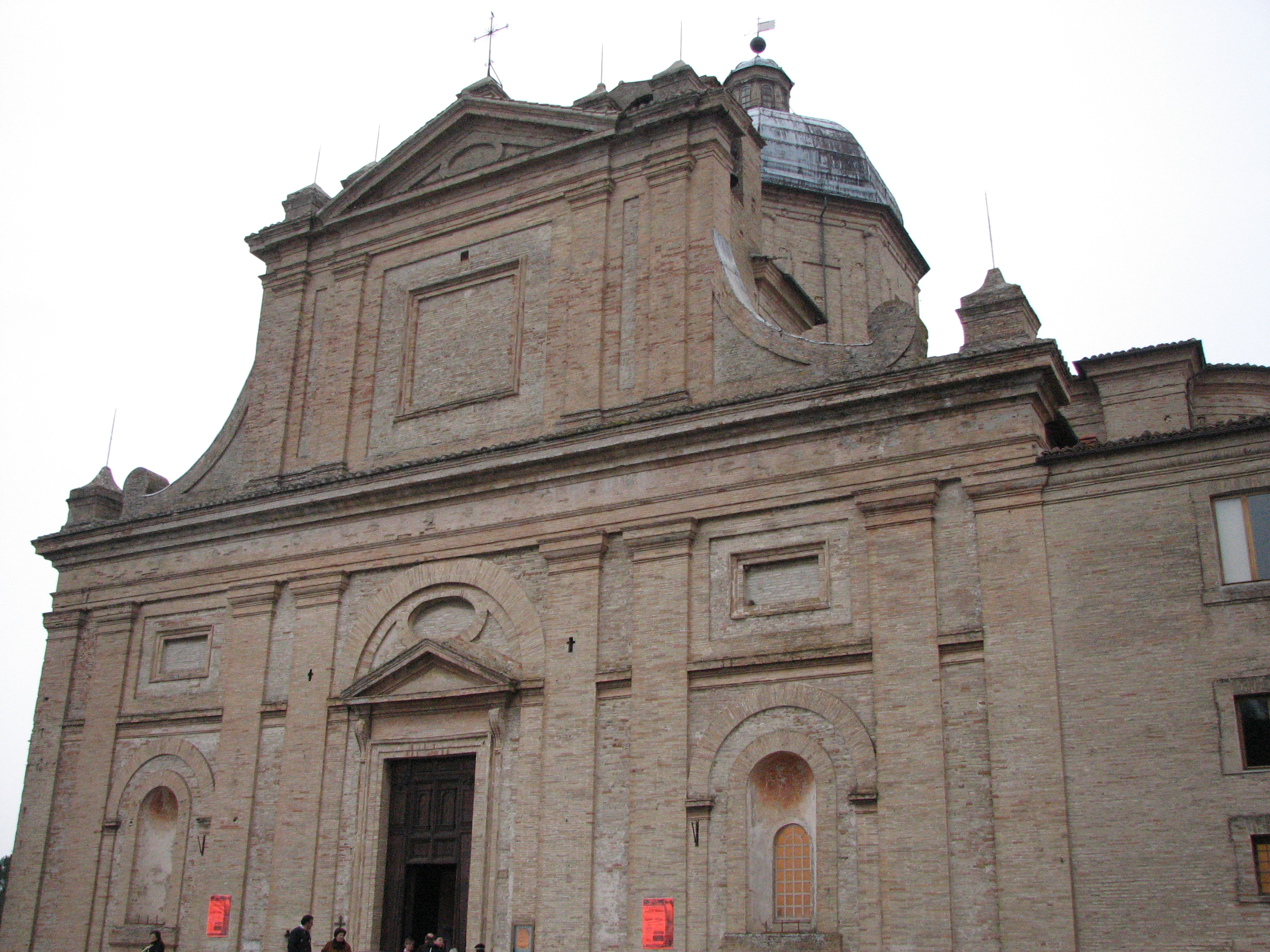
Church of Santa Maria delle Vergini

Santa Maria della Vergini is a Renaissance-style, Roman Catholic church located at the intersection of Via Lattanzio Ventura, Via Galasso da Carpi, and Via Contrada di Santa Maria delle Virgini, southeast of the historic center of Macerata, region of Marche, Italy.

== History ==
A church at the site likely dates to circa 1335. However, in 1533, Lorenzo De Carris painted an image of the Madonna delli Vergini, and by 1548 it was felt the image was performing miracles. In the small church of that time, a young girl, Barnadina di Bonino experienced an apparition of the Virgin.

By the mid 16th century, a new church was begun and consecrated in 1573. The architect was Galasso da Carpi, and it is said the church is based on designs of Donato Bramante, who was said to be at work on the apse of the Basilica of the Holy House of Loreto. Among the interior decoration is a canvas depicting the Adoration of the Magi (1587) by Tintoretto. In the church is an embalmed crocodile, likely a curio brought back to Italy from the Holy Land.
