= Salvarino Aliprandi =

Coat of arms of Family Aliprandi

Salvarino Aliprandi (died 1344) was an Italian Legal Counsel (jurisconsult) of the 14th century.

== Biography ==
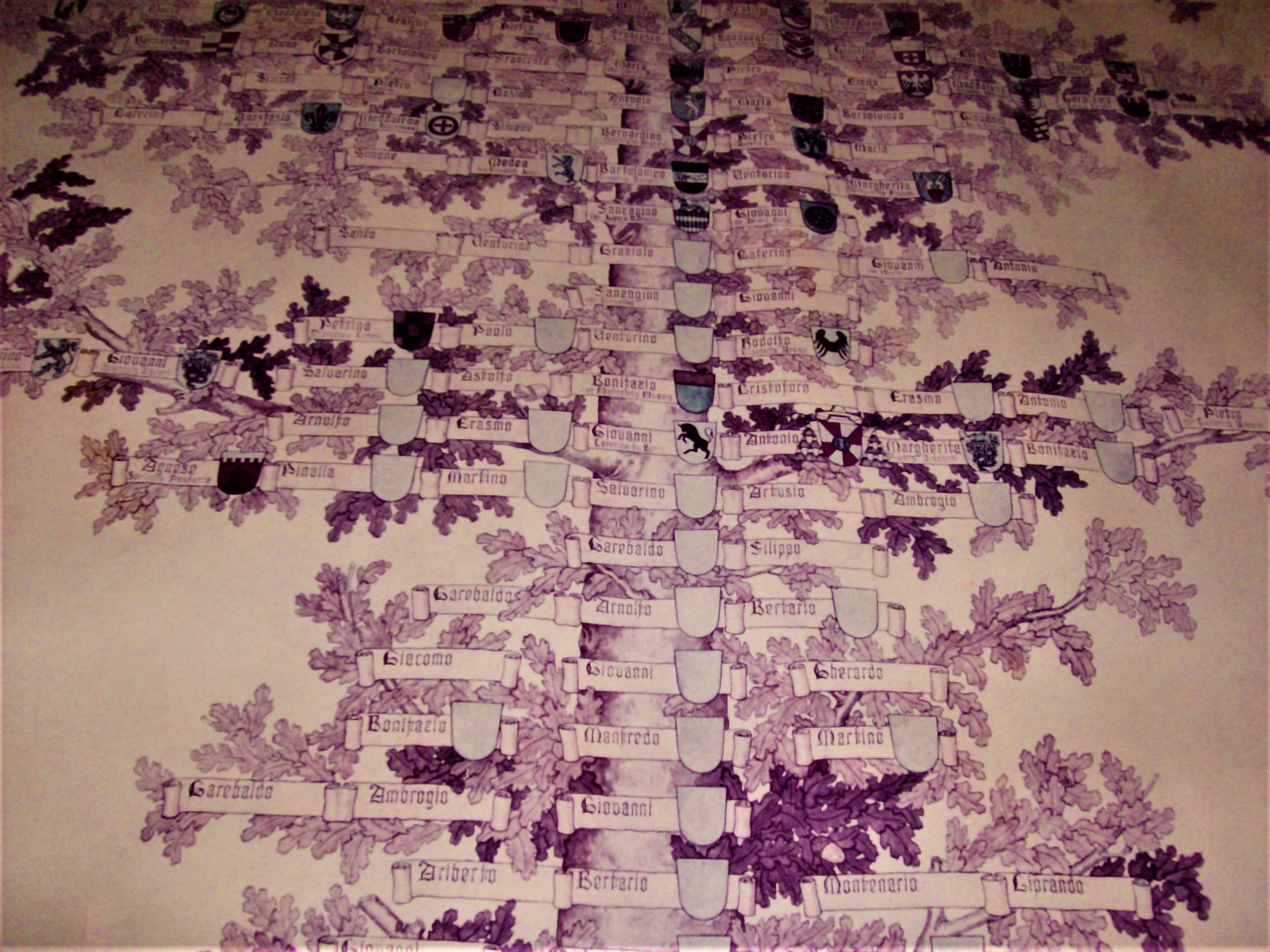
Genealogy of the house of Aliprandi Fanzago where figure Salvarino Aliprandi

Born in Monza in the late 13th century, he belonged to one of the most important families of Monza, even though he resided in Milan. He was son of Rebaldo, brother of Pinalla and Martino, Salvarino was a jurisconsult of the college of Milan, with his name appearing in the list of Milanese, proponents of the Visconti, who were tried in the years 1322–1324. He died in 1344, being buried in the Church of San Marco in a sarcophagus that depicts Christ the Judge welcoming him and the deceased, blessing them behind His throne with two angels holding His cloth.
