= Monte Camicia =

Mountain in Italy

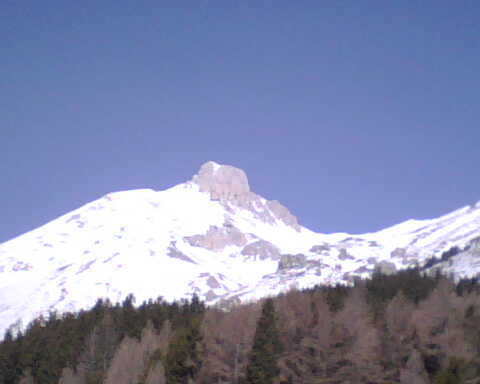

Highest point
- Elevation: 2,564 m (8,412 ft)
- Prominence: 640 m (2,100 ft)
- Coordinates: 42°26′N 13°43′E

Geography
- Location within Italy
- Location: Abruzzo, Italy
- Parent range: central Apennines

Monte Camicia is a mountain straddling the border between the province of Teramo and the province of L'Aquila in the Abruzzo region of Italy. It is part of the Gran Sasso d'Italia mountain chain.
