= Deaths in March 1978 =

The following is a list of notable deaths in March 1978. Entries for each day are listed alphabetically by surname. A typical entry lists information in the following sequence:

- Name, age, country of citizenship at birth, subsequent country of citizenship (if applicable), reason for notability, cause of death (if known), and reference.

== March 1978 ==
=== 1 ===
- Léon Azéma, 90, French architect.
- Oets Kolk Bouwsma, 79, American analytic philosopher.
- Joe Fitzgerald, 78, American football player.
- William H. Inzer, 72, American judge.
- Reino Oittinen, 65, Finnish politician.
- Kiyoshi Oka, 76, Japanese mathematician.
- Henry Edward George Rope, 97, British writer.
- Vladislav Ryzy-Ryski, 52, Soviet Belarusian Orthodox Church prelate.
- Kenneth M. Schricker, 57, American politician.
- Paul Scott, 57, English novelist (The Raj Quartet, Staying On), colon cancer.
- Arne Sørensen, 71, Danish politician, MP (1943–1947).
- Ted Strong, 64, American baseball and basketball player.
- Vasyl Symchych, 63, Soviet Ukrainian actor.

=== 2 ===
- Patricia Beck, 53, American writer, suicide by insulin overdose.
- Edward G. Begle, 63, American mathematician, developer of New Math, emphysema.
- Dick Dobeleit, 74, American football player.
- Jim Donnelly, 71, Australian cricketer.
- Ruth Dwyer, 80, American actress (Seven Chances).
- Bohuslav Havránek, 85, Czech literary historian and educator.
- Lajos Jánossy, 66, Hungarian physicist and mathematician.
- Yrjö Korholin-Koski, 77, Finnish-American Olympic runner (1928).
- Francis McGurk, 69, Scottish footballer.
- Mario Pei, 77, Italian-born American linguist, heart attack.
- James Allan Reid, 80, Canadian politician.
- George Lovejoy Rockwell, 88, American vaudeville and radio performer.
- Sukhlal Sanghvi, 97, Indian Jain scholar and philosopher.
- Zeinat Sedki, 65, Egyptian actress and comedian.

=== 3 ===
- Neal Carter, 75, Canadian mountaineer.
- Vlastimil Hajšman, 50, Czech Olympic ice hockey player (1952).
- Friederike Koderitsch, 83, Dutch Olympic fencer (1928).
- Billy Leahy, 66, Australian footballer.
- John A. Lynch Sr., 69, American politician, member of the New Jersey Senate (since 1956), cancer.
- Alfred J. Marrow, 72, American psychologist, leukemia.
- Georg Morgenstierne, 86, Norwegian linguist.
- Richard Power, 82, Irish cricketer.
- Robert William Prescott, 64, American flying ace and businessman, cancer.
- Otto Steinert, 62, German photographer.
- Sylvester Wackerle, 70, German Olympic bobsledder (1956).
- Vasily Yefanov, 77, Soviet painter.

=== 4 ===
- Élie Bloncourt, 81, French politician.
- Wesley Bolin, 68, American politician, governor of Arizona (since 1977), heart attack.
- Emmet Dalton, 80, American-born Irish film producer and general.
- Syed Zahoor Shah Hashmi, 51, Pakistani writer and poet.
- Günther Marks, 80, German organist and composer.
- Joe Marsala, 71, American jazz musician, cancer.
- William L. McKnight, 90, American businessman and philanthropist.
- John Meighan, 86–87, Irish politician, TD (1943–1944), senator (1944–1957).
- Olavi Munkki, 68, Finnish diplomat.
- Raoul Petouille, 84, French racing cyclist.
- Willis William Ritter, 79, American judge, cancer.
- Alfred Robinson, 83, British general.
- Abul Kalam Shamsuddin, 80, Bangladeshi journalist and politician.

=== 5 ===
- Kaïd Ahmed, 56, Algerian politician, heart attack.
- Cesare Andrea Bixio, 81, Italian composer.
- James A. Dooley, 63, American judge.
- Toshiko Higashikuni, 81, Japanese royal.
- John Lawes, 70, Australian businessman.
- May Mellanby, 95–96, English physiologist.
- Adolf Metzner, 67, German Olympic sprinter (1932, 1936).
- Norah Story, 75, Canadian archivist.
- Walter Muir Whitehill, 72, American historian and librarian, complications from a stroke.
- Zbigniew Załuski, 51, Polish politician, journalist and soldier, heart attack.

=== 6 ===
- Franco Anselmi, 22, Italian terrorist, shot.
- Luke Brown, 76, Australian footballer.
- Buckpasser, 15, American Thoroughbred racehorse, aortic dissection.
- John Burnaby, 86, British Anglican prelate.
- Clyde R. Chapman, 88, American politician and attorney, Maine attorney general (1933–1937).
- Boyd A. Clark, 60, American jurist and politician, stroke.
- K. L. Devaser, 66, Indian-born Malaysian politician.
- Ivan Duranthon, 81, French Olympic pentathlete (1924, 1932).
- John L. Hall Jr., 86, American naval admiral.
- Xercès Louis, 51, French footballer.
- Micheál Mac Liammóir, 78, Irish actor and playwright.
- David Price-White, 71, Welsh politician, MP (1945–1950).
- Howard Queen, 84, American soldier and educator.
- Frank Raymond, 74, Australian footballer.
- A. R. Souza Ferrão, 68, Indian playwright, actor and composer.
- Sir Leon Trout, 72, Australian businessman and art collector.
- Harold Sandys Williamson, 85, English painter.
- Notable East Germans killed in a helicopter crash:
  - Werner Lamberz, 48, politician
  - Paul Markowski, 48, politician
  - Hans-Joachim Spremberg, 34, photographer

=== 7 ===
- Norman Anderson, 75, American Olympic track and field athlete (1924).
- Arthur Batcheller, 89, American radio engineer.
- Steve Bilko, 49, American baseball player.
- Charles Bracht, 63, Belgian businessman and Olympic skier (1936), shot.
- Horace Dixon, 79, New Zealand rugby player.
- Ida Eise, 86, New Zealand artist.
- Israel Emiot, 69, Polish-American poet.
- Friedrich Engel-Janosi, 85, Austrian historian.
- Salvatore "Ciaschiteddu" Greco, 55, Italian mobster, cirrhosis.
- Malcolm Henderson, 86, British air marshal.
- Harald Kivioja, 69, Estonian sport shooter.
- David Lindsay, 71, New Zealand rugby player.
- Frank O'Rourke, 72, Australian footballer.
- Silas Papare, 59, Indonesian politician.
- Rudolf Schoeller, 75, Swiss racing driver.
- Billy Stuart, 78, Canadian ice hockey player.
- Fred R. Zeller, 78, American politician.

=== 8 ===
- Alexander Atkins, 93, Australian politician.
- Sir Walter Bassett, 85, Australian engineer and academic.
- German Bokun, 55, Soviet Olympic fencer (1952).
- Tjeerd Bottema, 94, Dutch artist.
- John Karl Daniels, 102, Norwegian-born American sculptor.
- Sir Roy Harrod, 78, English economist and writer.
- Wade Johnston, 79, American baseball player.
- Aulis Koponen, 71, Finnish footballer.
- Red Smith, 73, American baseball and football player.
- Adolf van der Voort van Zijp, 85, Dutch Olympic equestrian (1924, 1928).
- Rua Van Horn, 85, American home economist and educator.
- Henry Wriston, 88, American academic administrator.

=== 9 ===
- Raymond Didier, 58, American football and baseball coach.
- Bill Doran, 79, American baseball player.
- John K. Ewers, 73, Australian writer.
- L. Radley Flynn, 75, English singer and actor.
- Jack Millen, 77, Australian footballer.
- Sir Reg Pollard, 75, Australian general.
- Owen Rock, 81, Australian cricketer.
- Wingate Rollins, 83, American football coach and engineer.
- Giles Vandeleur, 66, British soldier.
- Henry Earle Vaughan, 66, American electrical engineer.
- André Verbeke, 70, Belgian architect and urban planner.
- Wu Yunfang, 81–82, Chinese politician.

=== 10 ===
- Sir John Baker, 80, British air marshal.
- Norbert A. Kosinski, 59, American politician, member of the Illinois Senate (since 1971), heart attack.
- V. Kumaraswamy, 58, Sri Lankan politician, MP (1947–1956).
- Charles Manning, 83, South African academic.
- Sir R. S. Ramakrishna Ranga Rao, 77, Indian politician.
- Herbert Raubenheimer, 81, American sports coach and educator.
- Sofia Vembo, 68, Greek singer and actress.
- Ronnie Waldman, 63, British radio presenter, cancer.
- Natale Zaninetti, 70, Italian racing cyclist.

=== 11 ===
- Torsten Andersson, 68, Swedish politician.
- Friedrich-Wilhelm Bock, 80, German Waffen-SS commander.
- Hélène Bouvier, 72, French opera singer.
- Sir Ralph Cusack, 61, Irish-born English barrister and judge.
- Claude François, 39, Egyptian-born French singer ("Comme d'habitude"), musician and dancer, electrocuted.
- Chet Gay, 78, American football player.
- Duro Ladipo, 51, Nigerian playwright.
- Julius Mägiste, 77, Estonian linguist.
- Dalal Mughrabi, 18–19, Palestinian militant, suicide fragging.
- Gail Rubin, 39, American photographer, shot.
- Priscilla Buchan, Baroness Tweedsmuir of Belhelvie, 63, Scottish politician, MP (1946–1966), cancer.
- Ward Van Orman, 83, American engineer, balloonist and inventor, stroke.

=== 12 ===
- Ferrell Anderson, 60, American baseball player.
- Sir Leonard Behrens, 87, British politician.
- Georges Cogniot, 76, French writer and politician.
- Tolchard Evans, 76, British songwriter and bandleader.
- James Howden, 77, New Zealand rugby player.
- Jean Kellogg, 61, American author.
- Bernie Leahy, 69, American football player.
- Alex McCarthy, 88, American baseball player.
- Gene Moore, 68, American baseball player.
- Sir Henry Ruthven Moore, 91, British naval admiral.
- J. Reagor Motlow, 80, American businessman and politician, heart attack.
- Edith E. Nicholls, 85, American physician.
- John Pesek, 84, American professional wrestler, heart attack.
- Mon Rivera, 52, Puerto Rican musician, heart attack.
- Semp Russ, 99, American football player and Olympic tennis player (1904).
- Dutch Schaefer, 62, American racing driver.
- Royston Simms, 84, Australian-born English cricketer
- Theresa Weld, 84, American Olympic figure skater (1920).
- William Witman II, 64, American diplomat, pulmonary illness.

=== 13 ===
- Kaare Bache, 79, Norwegian Olympic triple jumper (1920).
- Arthur Beavis, 72, English Olympic boxer (1924).
- Frank O. Bowman, 81, American general.
- John Cazale, 42, American actor (The Godfather, Dog Day Afternoon, The Deer Hunter), lung cancer.
- Luis Abraham Coreas, 27, Salvadoran footballer.
- Greta Fahlcrantz, 88, Swedish artist.
- Gaston Feuillard, 73, Guadeloupean politician.
- Milton Fowler Gregg, 85, Canadian politician and soldier, MP (1947–1957).
- Ghulam Guard, 52, Indian cricketer.
- Matthew Josephson, 79, American historian.
- Henry G. Sanchez, 70, American naval admiral.
- Preston Schoyer, 66, American journalist and Sinologist, lung cancer.
- Léon Van Aken, 80, Belgian racing cyclist.
- Leo Wainstein, 95, Russian-Finnish businessman and jurist.
- Ottar Wicklund, 66, Norwegian actor.

=== 14 ===
- Enrico Accorretti, 89, Italian naval admiral.
- John Marshall Butler, 80, American politician, member of the U.S. Senate (1951–1963), heart attack.
- Silvia de Grasse, 56, Panamanian singer.
- Umberto Fiore, 81, Italian politician.
- Kent Greenfield, 75, American baseball player.
- Georges Haupt, 50, Romanian-French historian and journalist, heart attack.
- Sam H. Hill, 79, American football and basketball coach.
- Odette Keun, 89, Dutch-English journalist.
- Carl Vincent Krogmann, 89, German politician.
- Anton Kuys, 74, Dutch Olympic racing cyclist (1928).
- C. W. Martin, 90, American football player and track coach.
- Donald Nichols, 76, American football player.
- Marguerite Radideau, 71, French Olympic sprinter (1928).
- Ismael Silva, 72, Brazilian samba musician, heart attack.
- Malcolm Taylor, 73, English cricketer.
- Sir John Whyatt, 72, British judge.

=== 15 ===
- Frank Elworthy, 84, English-born South African cricketer.
- George Henry Wilson Griffith, 86, English politician.
- Reza Hekmat, 86–87, Iranian politician.
- Jerzy Hryniewski, 82, Polish politician, prime minister in-exile (1954).
- Aleksander Kamiński, 75, Polish writer, educator and scouting leader.
- John A. McDougald, 70, Canadian businessman.
- Bobby McKean, 25, Scottish footballer, carbon monoxide poisoning.
- Francis Rodd, 2nd Baron Rennell, 82, British general.
- Arthur Useldinger, 73, Luxembourgian politician.

=== 16 ===
- Louise Heims Beck, 89, American vaudeville performer.
- André Boulloche, 62, French politician, plane crash.
- Mary Brooksbank, 80, Scottish trade unionist and songwriter.
- Thomas Byrne, 60, Irish politician, TD (1952–1961).
- Don Crowe, 58, Canadian football player.
- Harry Dunn, 71, British Olympic boxer (1928).
- Moe Franklin, 63, American baseball player.
- Kathryn Givney, 81, American actress.
- David MacMyn, 75, Scottish rugby player and surgeon.
- E. V. R. Maniammai, 61, Indian politician and social activist.
- Paul W. Manns, 67, American politician, member of the Virginia Senate (since 1966).
- Alfred Müller-Armack, 76, German economist and politician.
- Renny Ottolina, 49, Venezuelan entertainer, television presenter and politician, plane crash.
- János Paizs, 70, Hungarian Olympic sprinter (1928).
- Willi Petzold, 92, German painter.
- Lafayette Russell, 72, American football player and actor, heart attack.
- Paul Sjöberg, 80, Finnish Olympic sailor (1952).
- J. Rodolfo Wilcock, 58, Argentine-Italian writer and poet.
- Notable victims of the crash of Balkan Bulgarian Airlines Flight 107:
  - Georgi Dimitrov, 46, Bulgarian footballer
  - Rumyana Stefanova, 32, Bulgarian gymnast and gymnastics coach

=== 17 ===
- Eddie Aikau, 31, American surfer and lifeguard, drowned.
- Willie Campbell, 60, Irish hurler.
- Iracema de Alencar, 77, Brazilian actress.
- George Dickinson, 75, New Zealand cricketer and rugby player.
- Éva Erdélyi, 34, Hungarian Olympic swimmer (1964), gas explosion.
- Elisabeth Erdmann-Macke, 89, German writer.
- Jacques Forestier, 87, French physician and Olympic rugby player (1920).
- Semyon Furman, 57, Soviet chess player, cancer.
- Akitake Kōno, 66, Japanese actor.
- Henry Pelham, 70, Canadian Olympic rower (1932).
- Sally Phipps, 66, American actress.
- Percy Reddick, 81, British Anglican prelate.
- Malvina Reynolds, 77, American songwriter ("Morningtown Ride", "What Have They Done to the Rain", "Little Boxes") and political activist, kidney failure.
- Giacomo Violardo, 79, Italian Roman Catholic cardinal.
- Stu Worden, 70, American football player.

=== 18 ===
- Faith Baldwin, 84, American novelist.
- Leigh Brackett, 62, American author and screenwriter, cancer.
- François Duprat, 37, French politician and essayist, car bombing.
- Willy Hansen, 71, Danish Olympic cyclist (1924, 1928).
- Vernon Harrison, 58, American baseball player.
- Harvey N. Middleton, 83, American physician.
- Harald Pettersen, 66, Norwegian footballer.
- Raymond Raymond, 73, Canadian politician, MP (1957–1958).
- Esther Scliar, 51, Brazilian pianist and composer, suicide.
- Franz-Josef Spieker, 44, German filmmaker.
- Maurice Wood, 44, English cricketer.
- Peggy Wood, 86, American actress (Mama, The Sound of Music, The Story of Ruth), complications from a stroke.

=== 19 ===
- Guillermo Avalos, 55, Argentine Olympic runner (1948).
- M. A. Ayyangar, 87, Indian politician, MP (1951–1962).
- Diana Bourbon, 77, American journalist, actress and screenwriter.
- George Brown, 82, American baseball player.
- Wal Jenkins, 81, Australian footballer.
- Oswald Jonas, 81, Austrian musicologist.
- Gaston Julia, 85, French mathematician.
- Reidar Lund, 80, Norwegian cinematographer.
- Shukri Mustafa, 35, Egyptian militant (Takfir wal-Hijra), execution by hanging.
- Georges Serlez, 89, Belgian Olympic equestrian (1924).
- Arthur H. Singer, 68, American television producer (Star Trek: The Original Series, Hawaii Five-O).
- William Randall Slaughter, 63, American politician, member of the Florida House of Representatives (1949).
- Zakhar Sorokin, 61, Soviet flying ace.
- William H. Stevenson, 86, American politician, member of the U.S. House of Representatives (1941–1949).
- Carlos Torre Repetto, 73, Mexican chess player.
- Winifred Westover, 78, American actress (Lummox).

=== 20 ===
- Rafael Alers, 74, Puerto Rican composer.
- Jacques Brugnon, 82, French tennis player.
- Gherardo Del Colle, 58, Italian poet.
- Robert Gilbert, 78, German composer.
- Heinz Manchen, 46, German Olympic rower (1952).

=== 21 ===
- Leonard Beard, 82, New Zealand cricketer.
- Salvatore Briguglio, 48, American mobster, shot.
- Harry Bruno, 85, English-American aviator and businessman.
- Émile Bulteel, 71, French Olympic water polo player (1928).
- Louis Cottrell Jr., 67, American jazz musician.
- Fritz Coumbe, 88, American baseball player.
- Bill Keane, 77, Australian footballer.
- Mickey Murray, 79, Canadian ice hockey player.
- Cearbhall Ó Dálaigh, 67, Irish politician and judge, president (1974–1976), heart attack.
- Len Phillips, 86, Australian footballer.
- Béla Sándor, 58, Hungarian chess player.

=== 22 ===
- Isidro Ayora, 98, Ecuadorian politician, president (1929–1931).
- Márcio de Oliveira, 65, Brazilian Olympic long jumper (1936).
- Nellie Jane DeWitt, 82, American nurse.
- Sonora Smart Dodd, 96, American establisher of Father's Day.
- Grace Frank, 91, American historian, heart attack.
- John David Hissong, 78, American airmail pilot.
- Liu Jianxu, 85, Chinese politician and general.
- Gyula Ortutay, 67, Hungarian politician.
- Juho Pyy, 93, Finnish politician.
- Jens Sønderup, 84, Danish politician.
- Karl Wallenda, 73, German-American tightrope walker, fall.
- John Hall Wheelock, 91, American poet.

=== 23 ===
- Ludwig Alsdorf, 73, German Indologist and writer.
- Benjamin Araújo, 77, Portuguese Olympic wrestler (1928).
- Greta Dahlström, 90, Finnish composer.
- Yaroslav Iosseliani, 66, Soviet submarine commander.
- Bill Kenny, 63, American singer (The Ink Spots) and activist, respiratory disease.
- Aki Tammisto, 63, Finnish Olympic sprinter (1936).
- Akaki Vasadze, 78, Soviet Georgian actor and theatre director.
- Haim Ernst Wertheimer, 84, German-Israeli biochemist.
- Dave Wiggett, 20, English footballer, traffic collision.
- Alexander Wilson, 60, Scottish politician, MP (since 1970), complications from surgery.

=== 24 ===
- André Lallemand, 73, French astronomer.
- Just Lippe, 74, Norwegian politician and journalist.
- Elizabeth McCoy, 75, American microbiologist.
- Doğan Öz, 43–44, Turkish prosecutor, shot.
- Pak Mok-wol, 62, South Korean poet.
- Ray L. Reagan, 56, American judge, cancer.
- Herman W. Sachtjen, 91, American judge and politician, member of the Wisconsin State Assembly (1921–1925).

=== 25 ===
- Charles Alexander Best, 46, Canadian politician, MP (1957–1962), heart attack.
- Ego Brønnum-Jacobsen, 73, Danish actor.
- Leslie Fenton, 76, English actor and film director.
- Paul Hammer, 77, Luxembourgian Olympic track and field athlete (1920, 1924).
- Jack Hulbert, 85, British actor, filmmaker and singer.
- R. W. T. Lees-Jones, 86, British philatelist.
- Giuseppe Lombardi, 91, Italian naval admiral.
- William Mulloy, 60, American anthropologist, lung cancer.
- Richard Plunket Greene, 76, English racing driver and jazz musician.
- Karlis Princis, 84, Latvian-Swedish biologist.
- Hanna Ralph, 89, German actress.
- Louis B. Slichter, 81, American geophysicist.
- Louise Stokes, 64, American Olympic track and field athlete (1936), heart attack.
- Thomas Woodrooffe, 79, South African-born British broadcaster, writer and naval officer.

=== 26 ===
- Zaharah Agus, 55–56, Malaysian singer and actress.
- Dumitru Bădulescu, 85, Romanian flying ace.
- Tom Davey, 61, Australian footballer.
- John Ewasew, 56, Canadian politician, lung cancer.
- Ġużè Galea, 76, Maltese novelist, journalist and physician.
- Arnold Goodwin, 88, English-New Zealand artist and puppeteer.
- Lawrence Gubow, 59, American judge.
- George H. Otten, 88, American landscape architect.
- Ida Treat, 89, American writer and paleontologist.

=== 27 ===
- Nat Bailey, 76, American-born Canadian restaurateur (White Spot).
- Nan Braunton, 82, British actress (Dad's Army).
- William Jennings Bryan Jr., 88, American lawyer and politician.
- Ali Akbar Derakhshani, 82, Iranian general.
- Sir Stewart Duke-Elder, 79, Scottish opthamologist.
- Sverre Farstad, 58, Swedish Olympic speed skater (1948).
- Clemens Kapuuo, 55, Namibian politician and tribal chief, leader of Hereroland (since 1970), shot.
- Li Jinxi, 88, Chinese linguist.
- Frank Mitchinson, 93, New Zealand rugby player.
- Marius Nygaard, 75, Norwegian judge.
- Jean Orcel, 81, French minerologist.
- Wilfred Pickles, 73, English actor and radio presenter.
- Germain Seligman, 85, French-American art collector, dealer and historian.
- K. D. Singh, 56, Indian Olympic field hockey player (1948, 1952), suicide by gunshot.
- Dutch Zwilling, 89, American baseball player.

=== 28 ===
- Joe Bonomo, 76, American weightlifter, stuntman and actor.
- Sir Walter Crawford, 83, Australian colonial official and cricketer.
- William Foster MacNeece Foster, 88, English air marshal.
- Wally Guy, 67, Australian footballer.
- Wadie Haddad, 50–51, Palestinian militant, leukemia.
- Patrick Hunter Gordon, 61, Scottish electrical engineer, traffic collision.
- Money Johnson, 60, American jazz trumpeter, heart attack.
- Clemente Mejía, 49, Mexican Olympic swimmer (1948, 1952).
- Karl Lennart Oesch, 85, Finnish general.
- J. Hardin Peterson, 84, American politician, member of the U.S. House of Representatives (1933–1951).
- Juan Rostagno, 78, Argentine Olympic sports shooter (1936, 1948).
- Sir Henry Wilson Smith, 73, British civil servant.
- Ernst Stimmel, 87, German actor and playwright.
- Vilhjálmur Vilhjálmsson, 32, Icelandic musician and singer, traffic collision.

=== 29 ===
- Bob Cook, 32, Canadian ice hockey player
- Edith R Dick, 72, Canadian nurse.
- Jayasinghrao Ghorpade, 47, Indian cricketer.
- Ibrahim Khan, 83–84, Bangladeshi writer and politician.
- George Papashvily, 79, Russian-American writer and sculptor.
- Henri Peuchot, 88, French Olympic field hockey player (1928).
- Martin Plaa, 77, French tennis player.
- Eugène Schaus, 76, Luxembourgian politician.
- Kaarle Sorkio, 67, Finnish politician and businessman.
- Ragna Thiis Stang, 68, Norwegian historian and museum director, traffic collision.
- Evan Yang, 57, Chinese filmmaker and songwriter.

=== 30 ===
- Billy Cox, 58, American baseball player, esophageal cancer.
- Aileen Dent, 87–88, Australian artist.
- Harold Gimblett, 63, English cricketer.
- Syarif Hamid II of Pontianak, 64, Indonesian royal, sultan of Pontianak (1945–1950), liver disease.
- Sir Bill Hamilton, 78, New Zealand engineer.
- Karel Hromádka, 72, Czech ice hockey player.
- Petar Lončarević, 70, Yugoslav footballer, complications from blunt force trauma.
- George Paine, 69, English cricketer.
- Norman S. Paul, 59, American government official, cancer.
- Alfred E. Santangelo, 65, American politician, member of the U.S. House of Representatives (1957–1963), stroke.
- Hack Simpson, 67, Canadian ice hockey player.
- Friedrich Strindberg, 80, Swedish-Austrian journalist.
- Memduh Tağmaç, 73, Turkish general.
- Larry Young, 37, American jazz musician.

=== 31 ===
- Astrid Allwyn, 72, American actress, cancer.
- Barbara Andrews, 42, American Lutheran pastor, house fire.
- Joseph Berger-Barzilai, 73, Austrian-born Israeli politician.
- Charles Best, 79, American-born Canadian medical scientist, co-discoverer of insulin, complications from surgery.
- Thomas Elder Dickson, 78, Scottish artist.
- Hans Düby, 72, Swiss politician and trade unionist.
- Romain Gijssels, 71, Belgian racing cyclist.
- Karel Hájek, 78, Czechoslovak photographer.
- William Neville Harding, 85, Australian politician.
- Eva Mameli, 92, Italian botanist.
- Imre Rajczy, 66, Hungarian Olympic fencer (1936).
- Jimmy Reese, 65, American baseball player.
- Fernando Soleti, 86, Italian general.
- Ronald Ward, 76, British actor.
- James Wayne, 58, American R&B musician.
- Mohamed Zouaoui, 81–82, Ottoman-born Tunisian football player and manager.
