= Jeremy Kilpatrick =

American mathematics educator (1935–2022)

- Born: September 21, 1935; Fairfield, Iowa, United States of America
- Died: September 17, 2022 (aged 86); Athens, Georgia, U.S.
- Education: Stanford University
- Scientific career
- Fields: Mathematics Education
- Workplaces: Stanford University; Columbia University; University of Georgia
- Doctoral advisors: Edward Begle; George Pólya
- Doctoral students: João Pedro da Ponte; Patricio Herbst; Vilma Mesa

Jeremy Kilpatrick (September 21, 1935, in Fairfield, Iowa – September 17, 2022, in Athens, Georgia) was an American mathematics educator. He received the Felix Klein Medal for 2007 from ICMI (The International Commission on Mathematics Instruction). He graduated from Chaffey two-year college in California (1954), then he went to the University of California at Berkeley to earn an A.B degree (1956) in mathematics and after an M.A degree (1960) in education. He received his M.S. in mathematics in 1962 and his PhD degree in mathematics education in 1967, both from Stanford University, where he was also a research assistant in the SMSG (School Mathematics Study Group)(1962-1967). His dissertation was supervised by Edward Begle with George Pólya and Lee Conbrach in the doctoral committee, and addressed eight graders’ problem-solving heuristics. From 1967 to 1975 he taught from as an assistant and later as an associate professor at Teachers College, Columbia University, in New York. In 1975, he moved to the University of Georgia, where he was a professor of mathematics education.

He received the National Council of Teachers of Mathematics Lifetime Achievement Award for Distinguished Service to Mathematics Education in 2003. He also received the Felix Klein Medal for 2007 from ICMI (The International Commission on Mathematics Instruction). More recently Jeremy Kilpatrick received The Award for Interdisciplinary Excellence in Mathematics Education by Texas A&M University.

== Publications ==
- Problem solving in mathematics, Review of Educational Research, vol. 39, 1969, pp. 523–533
- Co-Editor with Izaak Wirzup of Soviet Studies in the Psychology and Teaching of Mathematics, SMSG, 1969–1975.
- With George Polya, The Stanford mathematics problem book: with hints and solutions, Teachers College Press, New York, 1974.
- With Geoffrey Howson and Christine Keitel, Curriculum Development in Mathematics, Cambridge University Press, 1981.
- Co-editor of the Proceedings of the Fourth International Congress on Mathematical Education, 1983.
- "A retrospective account of the past twenty-five years of research on teaching mathematical problem solving". In E. A. Silver (Ed.), Teaching and learning mathematical problem solving (pp. 1–16), Erlbaum 1985.
- "A history of research in mathematics education". In Douglas A. Grouws (Ed.), Handbook of Research on Mathematics Teaching and Learning, Macmillan 1992.
- Co-Editor of the International Handbook of Mathematics Education, Kluwer, 1996.
- With Lynn Hancock, Denise S. Mewborn and Lynn Stallings, "Teaching and learning cross-country mathematics: a story of innovation in precalculus". In Senta A. Raizen, Edward D. Britton (Eds.), Bold Ventures: Case Studies of U.S. Innovations in Mathematics Education, vol. 3, pp. 133–244, Kluwer 1996.
- Co-Editor with Anna Sierpinska, Mathematics education as a research domain: a search for identity: an ICMI study, Kluwer 1998.
- With Jane Swafford, Bradford Findell, Adding it up: helping children learn mathematics, National Academy Press 2001.
- With Jane Swafford, Helping Children Learn Mathematics, National Academies Press 2002.
- Co-Editor with W. Gary Martin and Deborah Schifter, A Research Companion to Principles and Standards for School Mathematics, National Council of Teachers of Mathematics, 2003.
- Co-Editor with George M. A. Stanic, A History of School Mathematics, 2 volumes, National Council of Teachers of Mathematics, 2003.
- Co-Editor of Second International Handbook of Mathematics Education, Springer, 2003.
- Co-Editor with Celia Hoyles and Ole Skovsmose, Meaning in Mathematics Education, Springer 2005.
- With Alan Schoenfeld, Toward a Theory of Proficiency in Teaching Mathematics. International Handbook of Mathematics Teacher Education (vol. 2, pp. 1–35), Sense, 2008.
- "History of Research in Mathematics Education". In Stephen Leman (Ed.), Encyclopedia of Mathematics Education, Springer 2014.

== Awards ==
- 2017 – The Award for Interdisciplinary Excellence in Mathematics Education
- 2007 – The Felix Klein Medal by The International Commission on Mathematics Instruction
- 2003 – Lifetime Achievement Award for Distinguished Service to Mathematics Education by The National Council of Teachers of Mathematics
