= John Lawes (disambiguation) =

John Bennet Lawes (1814–1900) was an English businessman and scientist.

John Lawes may also refer to:

- Sir John Lawes School, a secondary school in Harpenden, United Kingdom
- John Lawes (company director) (1907–1978), Australian chairman of QBE Insurance
