= Rua =

Rua means 'street' in Portuguese and Galician language, and is the number 'two' in several Polynesian languages. It may refer to:

== Music ==
- Rua (band), a New Zealand Celtic fusion band
- Rua (Clann Zú album), 2003
- Rua (Moana and the Moahunters album), 1998
- The Rua, a family pop rock band from Windsor, England

== People ==
- Rua Kēnana Hepetipa (1869–1937), Maori self-proclaimed prophet
- Rua Tipoki (born 1975), rugby union player
- Rugila or Rua (died 434), warlord who united the Huns under his sole kingship by 432
- Rua Van Horn (1892–1978), American educator, federal official

=== Surname ===
- Antonio de la Rúa (born 1974), Argentine lawyer
- Fernando de la Rúa (1937–2019), Argentine president
- Jorge de la Rúa (1942–2015), Argentine government official
- Matt Rua (born 1977), rugby league player
- Maurício Rua (born 1981), Brazilian mixed martial arts fighter
- Michele Rua (1837–1910), co-founder of the Salesian Order
- Murilo Rua (born 1980), Brazilian mixed martial arts fighter
- Ryan Rua (born 1990), American professional Major League Baseball player

== Other uses ==
- Rua (Moimenta da Beira), a Portuguese parish in the municipality of Moimenta da Beira
- CLG Eoghan Rua, a Gaelic Athletic Association club

== See also ==
- RUA (disambiguation)
