= Max Millen =

Australian rules footballer, born 1909

Personal information
- Full name: Stanley Mac Millen
- Born: 7 July 1909; Seymour, Victoria
- Died: 4 September 1973 (aged 64); Prince Henry's Hospital, South Melbourne, Victoria
- Height: 172 cm (5 ft 8 in)
- Weight: 72 kg (159 lb)

Playing career^{1}
Years	Club	Games (Goals)
1932	North Melbourne	8 (7)
- ^{1} Playing statistics correct to the end of 1932.

Stanley Mac "Max" Millen (7 July 1909 – 4 September 1973) was an Australian rules footballer who played with North Melbourne in the Victorian Football League (VFL).

== Family ==
The son of George Robert Millen (1873-1957), and Edith Elizabeth Millen (1874-1940), née Rice, Stanley Mac Millen was born at Seymour, Victoria on 7 July 1909.

His brother, Jack Millen, played VFL football with Fitzroy, and VFA football with Coburg.

He married Noreen Johnson (1915-1996) in 1937.

== Football ==
In 1931 he was granted a clearance from Fitzroy to South Melbourne, and, in 1932, from South Melbourne to North Melbourne.

=== North Melbourne (VFL) ===
North Melbourne had finished the 1931 home-and-away VFL season with 18 losses from 18 matches.

Millen played his first game for the North Melbourne First XVIII, among six "new" players -- i.e., Les Allen, Tom Leather, Millen, Jack Smith, Dick Taylor, Jack Welsh -- under the team's new captain-coach, Taylor, against Geelong, at Corio Oval, on 30 April 1932.

== Death ==
He died at Prince Henry's Hospital, in South Melbourne, Victoria, on 4 September 1973.
