= Gran Sasso raid =

1943 Nazi German raid to free Benito Mussolini from prison

Coordinates: 42°26′32.73″N 13°33′31.66″E

- Part of World War II
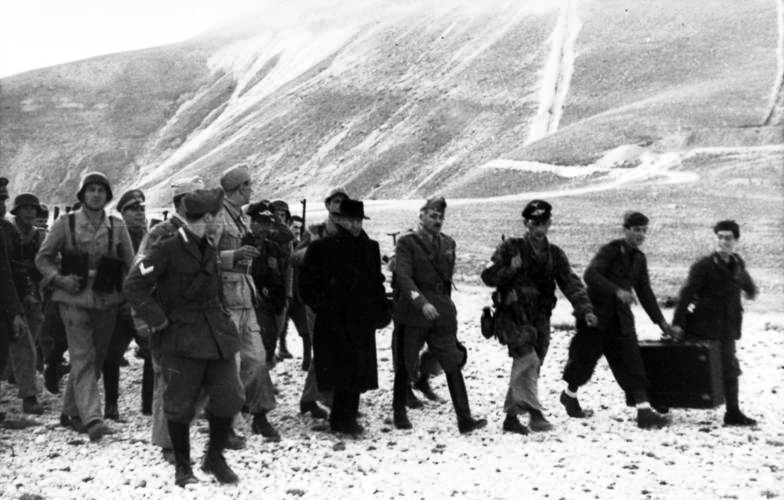
- Mussolini with German commandos
- Type: Prison escape with outside help
- Location: Hotel Campo Imperatore, Italy
- Planned: Summer 1943
- Planned by: Harald Mors
- Target: Campo Imperatore
- Date: 12 September 1943; 83 years ago
- Executed by: Under the command of Otto Skorzeny: 2nd Parachute Division; 502nd SS Jäger Battalion
- Outcome: Benito Mussolini escaped from prison
- Casualties: 2 Italians killed, 10 Germans wounded

The Gran Sasso raid on 12 September 1943 freed Benito Mussolini from imprisonment in a hotel on the Gran Sasso d'Italia massif. The World War II operation was codenamed Operation Oak (German: Unternehmen Eiche) by the German military. This raid, carried out by German paratroopers and Waffen-SS was personally ordered by Adolf Hitler, approved by General Kurt Student, and planned and executed by Major Harald Mors. Hauptsturmführer Otto Skorzeny’s role was more opportunistic and subordinate, at best.

Operation Oak was marketed as a stunning military feat by Nazi propagandists, aiming to provide a morale boost at a low point in the war for Germany. In fact, the Germans controlled the territory around the hotel and were never in great danger.

== Background ==
The Allied invasion of Sicily in July 1943 led to the bombing of Rome in World War II. On the night of 24 July 1943, the Grand Council of Fascism passed a motion of no confidence against Prime Minister Benito Mussolini. On 25 July, King Victor Emmanuel III arrested Mussolini and replaced him with Marshal Pietro Badoglio. The end of Mussolini's Fascist regime is known as 25 Luglio in Italy. Badoglio's government remained allied with the Axis powers for a few more weeks.

By 17 August, the Allies had defeated the Italians and Germans in Sicily, and Italy began secret negotiations to surrender. On 3 September, the Allied invasion of Italy began and Giuseppe Castellano signed the Armistice of Cassibile, which ended the nation's war with the Allies. The armistice was not announced until 8 September.

Badoglio wanted the Allies to move as far north as possible before revealing the truce, knowing the German army would respond by seizing Italian territory. The Nazis launched Operation Achse on 8 September, occupying key positions in central and northern Italy. Many Italian soldiers simply refused to fight the Germans. Marshal Badoglio and King Victor Emmanuel III fled to Allied-controlled territory in southern Italy.

== Preparations ==
=== Mussolini's imprisonment ===
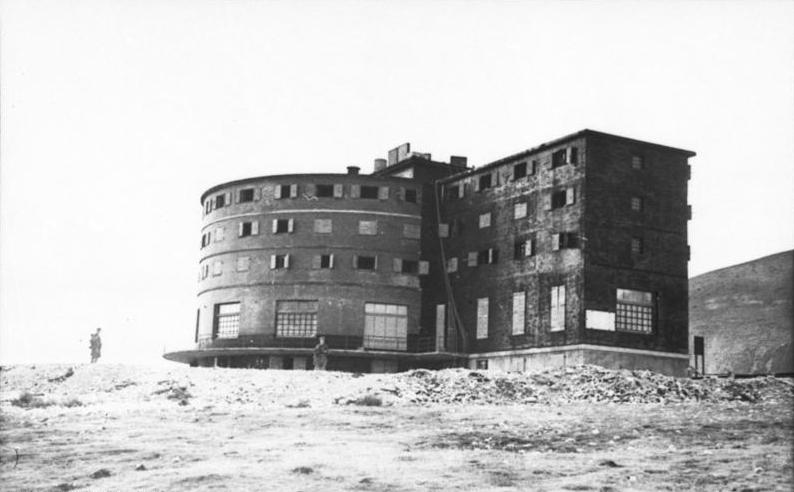
Hotel Campo Imperatore.

The Badoglio government feared Mussolini's reinstatement by Germany. He was heavily guarded and moved several times. When the Carabinieri arrested Mussolini in Rome on 25 July, they initially brought him to their headquarters in Trastevere. He was held at the Carabinieri Cadet School until 27 July, when the military police escorted him to Gaeta. On 28 July, they arrived at an isolated house on Ponza, an island in the Tyrrhenian Sea. Mussolini was kept there until 7 August. He was held at a private villa on La Maddalena until 27 August. The following day, he was moved to the Hotel Campo Imperatore.

The Hotel Campo was built on a remote and defendable mountain plateau 2,112 metres above sea level in the Gran Sasso d'Italia mountain range. A ski station was located next to the hotel. The hotel is shaped like the letter 'd'. Two more hotels shaped as 'v' and 'x' to form the Latin word "dux" (leader) were planned but never built. The title Il Duce derived from dux.

=== German tracking and planning ===
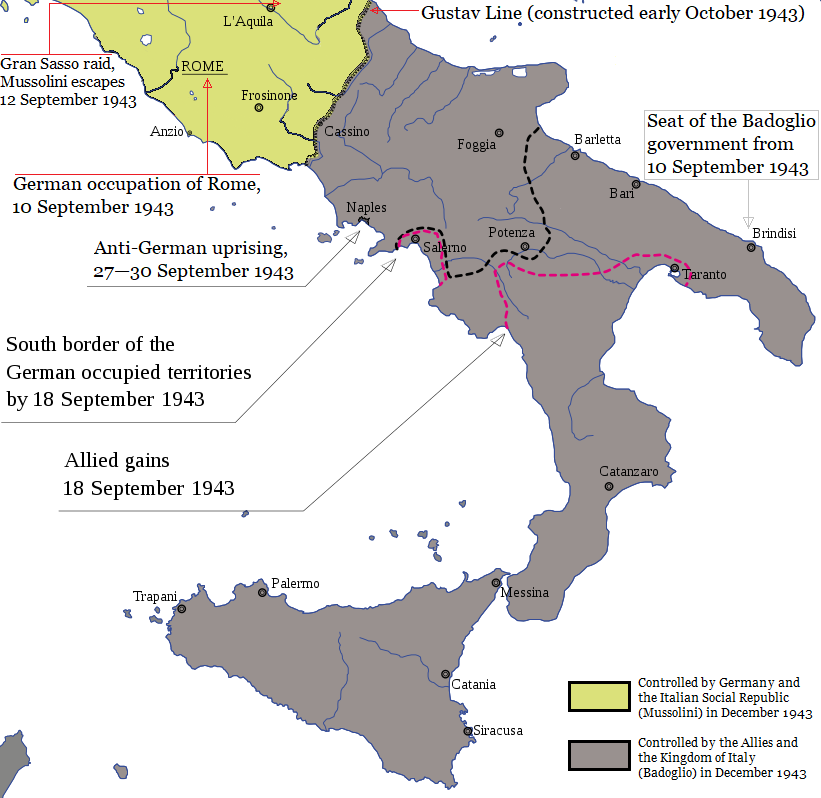
Italian military situation in September 1943. Hotel Campo is just outside L'Aquila (upper left).

Adolf Hitler secretly ordered General Kurt Student to oversee a mission to liberate Mussolini. SS-Obersturmbannführer Herbert Kappler learned about Mussolini's transfer from La Maddalena through one of Edda Ciano's letters. Kappler also paid informants with counterfeit money created during Operation Bernhard. His agents also intercepted a message about security preparations at Gran Sasso, which indicated Mussolini might be imprisoned there. A German doctor feigned interest in setting up a clinic at the hotel in order to confirm the deposed tyrant was being held there.

Hauptsturmführer Otto Skorzeny was detailed to Student. On 8 September, he scouted the Gran Sasso to strategize how to free Mussolini. The elevation of the hotel made parachuting risky. Harald Mors and General Student devised a plan to deliver troops by military glider. To their surprise, Skorzeny insisted on going along. Several of General Student's paratroopers (Fallschirmjäger) were then replaced by Skorzeny and the SS.

== Raid ==
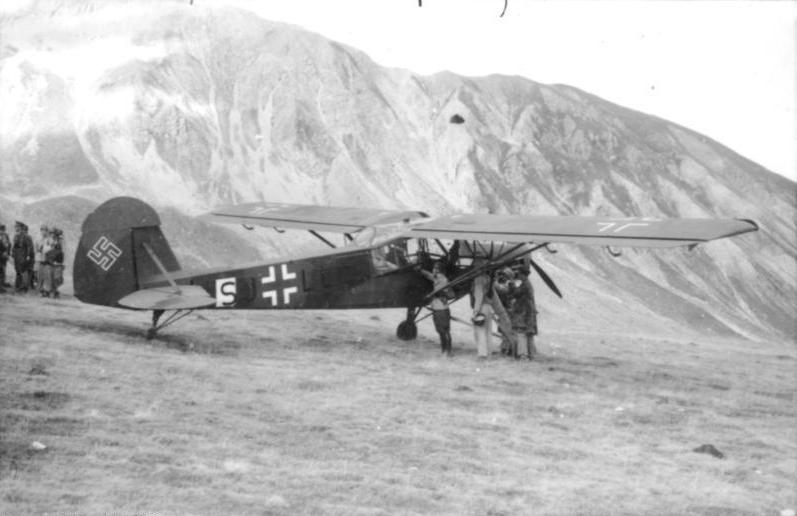
This Fieseler Fi 156 helped Mussolini escape.

By the day of the raid, 12 September, Germany controlled the territory around the Hotel Campo, making Mussolini's rescue far less dangerous. It is unclear why Italy moved Mussolini so far north into the path of Germany's approach.

Major Harald Mors commanded the entire operation and led the ground assault. German tanks and armored cars swarmed the base of the mountain while paratroopers and an SS commando unit approached the Hotel Campo by air. Mors cut all telephone lines. Italian forestry guard Pasqualino Vitocco was killed while attempting to warn the garrison of the attack. Carabiniere Giovanni Natale was killed while preparing to open fire on Mors' troops. Two more carabinieri were slightly wounded by a hand grenade. These were the only casualties of the operation.

Meanwhile, several Henschel Hs 126 planes took off from Pratica di Mare Air Base near Rome just after midday. They towed ten DFS 230 gliders, each carrying nine soldiers and a pilot. Italian general Fernando Soleti was flying with the soldiers. He had been arrested and forced to come in hopes that Mussolini's guards would not fire on an officer they recognized.

Oberleutnant Georg Freiherr von Berlepsch led the airborne operation. The gliders looped to gain altitude over the Alban Hills, but Skorzeny ordered the gliders with his SS troops to skip the maneuver in order to arrive first. Skorzeny further disrupted the glider formation by demanding to land near the hotel, which caused one of the aircraft to crash.

Mussolini was guarded by dozens of well-equipped Carabinieri. Like their countrymen elsewhere during Operation Achse, they had little interest in shooting at Germans. According to the hotel managers, Mussolini leaned out his window and pleaded for no bloodshed. General Soleti also ordered the guards not to shoot. Mors ascended to the hotel from the valley and introduced himself to Mussolini. The raid was over in a matter of minutes. German soldiers soon escorted Mussolini out of the hotel and made sure that the moment was photographed and filmed.

General Student's personal pilot arrived in a Fieseler Fi 156 Storch for Mussolini. The short takeoff and landing plane was at capacity with Mussolini on board, but Skorzeny insisted on overloading the plane by boarding. After an extremely dangerous takeoff, they returned to Pratica di Mare. Mussolini requested to be taken to Rocca delle Caminate. They continued in a Heinkel He 111 to Vienna, where Mussolini stayed overnight at the Hotel Imperial. On 14 September, Mussolini was flown to Munich and then on to East Prussia, where he reunited with Hitler.

== Aftermath ==
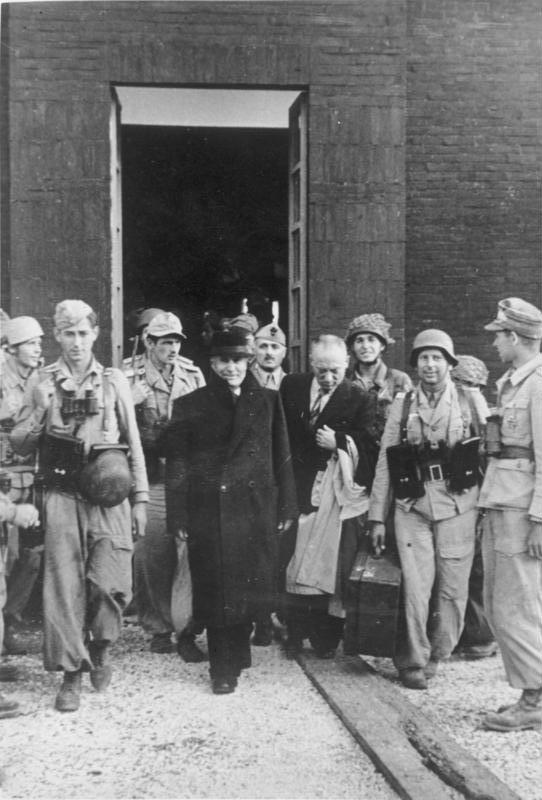
Mussolini leaving the hotel, flanked by General Fernando Soleti, General Gueri, Karl Radl (holding suitcase).

British prime minister Winston Churchill addressed the escape in the House of Commons: "Knowing that il Duce was hidden in a safe place and that the Government of Badoglio was committed to handing him over to the Allies, a daring attack, completely beyond all foresight, prevented this from happening."

The operation was a propaganda coup for the Germans. They glamorized it in the pages of Signal. The Nazis ensured film crews captured the entire operation and distributed it via newsreel. The Germans broadcast a speech purportedly by Mussolini where he boasted, "The liberation—the enterprise was an example of the organization and resolution of the Germans which will live in history—will in the future become legendary."

Although the landing at Campo Imperatore was led by First Lieutenant von Berlepsch under Mors' command, Skorzeny and the SS would become the face of the triumph. Skorzeny was named Sturmbannführer, awarded the Knight's Cross of the Iron Cross, and dubbed the "most dangerous man in Europe".

In 1950, Skorzeny published a bestselling autobiography, Geheimkommando Skorzeny (Secret Commando Skorzeny). He wrote another memoir in 1976, Meine Kommandounternehmen (My Commando Operations). The Nazi legend of his part in the scheme was the dominant narrative for decades. His exaggerated credit overshadowed the genuine role of the paratroopers.

General Student's paratroopers were shocked to see Skorzeny and the SS given credit for Operation Oak. Major Mors demanded Student correct the record, but Student confessed he did not want to provoke Heinrich Himmler. Allied media were skeptical of the boasts from Berlin.

By all accounts, the man the Germans rescued was broken and bore little resemblance to the swaggering Il Duce. Mussolini had attempted suicide while under arrest. He had been seriously ill throughout the war, and his health got much worse during captivity. It was only after reuniting with this family in Munich that he started to come back to life. Hitler had to bully Mussolini to return home. Mussolini established the Italian Social Republic, a puppet state in German-occupied northern Italy. It collaborated with Germany in the fight against the Allies, which now included the Kingdom of Italy.

== See also ==
- Operation Achse
