= Vilma Mesa =

Colombian-American mathematics educator

Vilma María Mesa Narváez (born 1963) is a Colombian-American mathematics educator whose research topics have included secondary-school curriculum development, college-level calculus instruction, mathematics in community colleges, international perspectives in mathematics education, and inquiry-based learning. She is a professor of education and mathematics at the University of Michigan, where she is affiliated with the Center for the Study of Higher and Post-secondary Education.

== Education and career ==
Mesa earned her bachelor's degrees in computer science and mathematics at the University of Los Andes (Colombia) in 1986 and 1987, respectively, and became a computer programmer for the Colombian government and in the private sector. From 1988 to 1995 she worked as a researcher at the University of Los Andes, working in mathematics education and authoring textbooks on mathematics and statistics for applications including engineering and social sciences.

In 1996, she began graduate study in mathematics education at the University of Georgia, where she earned her master's degree in 1996 and completed her Ph.D. in 2000. Her dissertation, Conceptions of Function Promoted by Seventh- and Eighth-Grade Textbooks from Eighteen Countries, was jointly advised by Jeremy Kilpatrick and Edward Arthur Azoff.

After postdoctoral research at the University of Michigan, she stayed on at the University of Michigan as a coordinator for the master's program in curriculum development and as an instructional consultant until she was hired in 2005 as an assistant professor of mathematics education in the School of Education. She was tenured in 2014 and added a joint appointment in the university's mathematics department in 2015.

In 2016, she visited the University of Santiago, Chile as a Fulbright Scholar.

Mesa was Associate Editor for the Journal for Research in Mathematics Education from 2000-2004 and is associate editor for Educational Studies in Mathematics.

== Recognition ==
Mesa is the 2022 winner of the Louise Hay Award for Contributions to Mathematics Education, where she was recognised "for her distinguished contributions to mathematics education research at the collegiate level, for her teaching and mentorship, and as an advocate for access to mathematics for women and members of underprivileged populations."

In 2022, Mesa was awarded the University of Michigan's Outstanding Undergraduate Research Opportunity Mentor Award.

Messa is a 2024 recipient of the American Mathematical Association of Two-Year College's (AMATYC) Mathematics Leadership Excellence Award. The award is intended for educators who have made outstanding contributions through leadership in mathematics or mathematics education in the first two years of college.
