= RUA =

RUA may refer to:

- Royal Ulster Academy, an Irish artist organization
- Robot Unicorn Attack, an online game first published in 2010
- Royal University of Agriculture, Cambodia, a public university in Phnom Penh
- ^RUA, Russell 3000 Index ticker symbol
- NETL-RUA, the United States Department of Energy’s National Energy Technology Laboratory (NETL) Regional University Alliance (RUA), a partnership to solving energy problems

== See also ==
- Rua (disambiguation)
