= Patricio Herbst =

American mathematician

Patricio G. Herbst
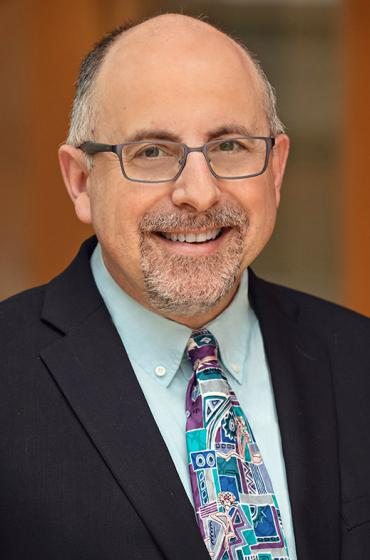
- Born: Patricio Guillermo Herbst; Concordia, Entre Ríos, Argentina
- Known for: Research on geometry education; theory of practical rationality, development of educational technologies
- Awards: Fulbright Scholarship

Academic background
- Education: Universidad Nacional del Nordeste (B.Sc equivalent), University of Georgia (M.A., Ph.D.)
- Doctoral advisor: Jeremy Kilpatrick

Academic work
- Institutions: University of Michigan

Patricio Guillermo Herbst is an Argentine–American educator and researcher in mathematics education. He is Professor of Education and Mathematics at the University of Michigan, where he has also chaired the Educational Studies Program. Herbst is known for his work on the teaching and learning of geometry, the theory of practical rationality in mathematics instruction, and the use of digital media to support teacher education. He is the editor of the Journal for Research in Mathematics Education and has authored or co-authored more than 100 scholarly articles and several books. He has an h-index of 41.

== Early life and education ==
Herbst was born in Concordia, Entre Ríos, Argentina, and raised in Corrientes. He graduated with highest honors from the Universidad Nacional del Nordeste in 1987 with the degree of Profesor en Matemática y Cosmografía.

He worked as a mathematics teacher in secondary schools and as an instructor at the Universidad Nacional del Nordeste (1987–1990). From 1990 to 1993 he was a researcher at the Universidad Nacional de Córdoba, where he joined the GECyT group on mathematics, science, and technology education.

In 1993, he received a Fulbright scholarship to pursue graduate studies in the United States. At the University of Georgia, he earned an M.A. (1995) and a Ph.D. (1998) in mathematics education under the supervision of Jeremy Kilpatrick. His dissertation was titled What Works as Proof in the Mathematics Class.

== Academic career ==
Following a postdoctoral fellowship at Michigan State University (1998–1999), Herbst joined the University of Michigan in 1999 as Assistant Professor of Mathematics Education. He was promoted to Associate Professor in 2005, received a joint appointment in the Department of Mathematics in 2010, and became full Professor in 2013.

From 2015 to 2018, he served as chair of the Educational Studies Program at Michigan. He has also held leadership positions in professional organizations and is Editor of the Journal for Research in Mathematics Education, becoming the first Latinx scholar in that role.

== Research ==
Herbst’s research focuses on how mathematics is taught and learned, with a particular emphasis on geometry and proof at the secondary and collegiate levels. He is known for developing (with Daniel Chazan) the theory of practical rationality to explain the professional and situational norms that shape teachers’ instructional decisions.

In 2001 he established the GRIP (Grasping the Rationality of Instructional Practice) research group at the University of Michigan, which investigates teacher decision-making and instructional practice in mathematics.

Herbst has led or co-led numerous projects funded by the National Science Foundation, including ThEMaT (Thought Experiments in Mathematics Teaching), SIMTEACH, and GeT Support, which support research on teacher knowledge and the development of digital tools for teacher education.

He has been central in designing technology platforms such as LessonSketch, Anotemos, and LessonDepict, which use storyboarding, animation, and scenario-based assessments to study and improve mathematics instruction.

== Publications ==
Herbst is author or editor of several books and has contributed to over 100 journal articles and book chapters.

=== Books ===
- Herbst, Patricio; Fujita, Taro; Halverscheid, Stefan; Weiss, Michael (2017). The Learning and Teaching of Geometry in Secondary Schools: A Modeling Perspective. Routledge. ISBN 978-1-138-18409-5.
- Herbst, Patricio; Cheah, Ui Hock; Jones, Keith; Richard, Philippe (2018). (ed.). International Perspectives on the Teaching and Learning of Geometry in Secondary Schools. Springer. ISBN 978-3-319-77476-3.
- Zazkis, Rina; Herbst, Patricio (2018). (ed.). Scripting Approaches in Mathematics Education: Mathematical Dialogues in Research and Practice. Springer. ISBN 978-3-319-62692-5.

=== Selected articles ===
- Herbst, Patricio; Chazan, Daniel (2020). "Mathematics teaching has its own imperatives: Mathematical practice and the work of mathematics instruction". ZDM Mathematics Education. 52 (7): 1149–1162. doi:10.1007/s11858-020-01157-7.
- Dimmel, Justin; Herbst, Patricio (2018). "What details do teachers expect from students' proofs?". Journal for Research in Mathematics Education. 49 (3): 261–291. doi:10.5951/jresematheduc.49.3.0261.
- Herbst, Patricio (2003). "Using novel tasks to teach mathematics: Three tensions affecting the work of the teacher". American Educational Research Journal. 40 (1): 197–238. doi:10.3102/00028312040001197.

== Awards and honors ==
- Fulbright Scholarship, 1993–1995
- Antorchas Foundation Doctoral Fellowship, 1997–1998
- NSF CAREER Award, 2002–2007
- Early Publication Award, AERA Special Interest Group for Research in Mathematics Education, 2003
- Pattishall Award, University of Michigan School of Education, 2009
- New Leadership Academy Fellow, University of Michigan, 2018–2019
