= Vroman's Bookstore =

Independent bookstore in Southern California

Coordinates: 34.1461°N 118.1361°W

- Type: Private
- Industry: Retail
- Founded: November 14, 1894; 131 years ago in Pasadena
- Founder: A.C. Vroman
- Headquarters: Pasadena, California
- Number of locations: 2
- Area served: Pasadena
- Products: books
- Website: vromansbookstore.com

Vroman's Bookstore is the oldest and largest independent bookstore in Southern California.

The store hosts over 400 free community events a year including children's storytimes, trivia nights, craft classes, bake-offs, and launch parties, and has hosted such authors as President Bill Clinton, President Jimmy Carter, Irving Stone, Upton Sinclair, Ray Bradbury, David Sedaris, Salman Rushdie, Walter Mosley, Joan Didion, Barbara Walters, Anne Rice, Neil Gaiman, Justice Sonia Sotomayor, and Bernie Sanders.

== History ==
Founded in 1894 by Adam Clark Vroman, the original Vroman's Book and Photographic Supply store was located at 60 E. Colorado St in Pasadena, California. Mr. Vroman loved books and loved giving back to his community. Mr. Vroman was also a passionate photographer, specializing in scenes of the American West and his portraits of Native Americans. When Mr. Vroman died in 1916, he left the bookstore to long-time employees.

During World War II, Vroman's donated and delivered books to Japanese Americans interned at nearby camps, such as the Manzanar camp in Owens Valley.

In 2008, Vroman's was named Bookseller of the Year by Publishers Weekly, an international news magazine of book publishing.

In 2009, Vroman's bought another beloved independent bookstore, Book Soup in West Hollywood, after its owner died and the store was in danger of closing.

In 2020, Vroman's Bookstore itself was in danger of closing due to a significant drop in sales resulting from the COVID-19 pandemic.

In early 2024, Joel Sheldon III, the long-time owner of Vroman's, announced that he was looking for a new buyer for the bookstore.

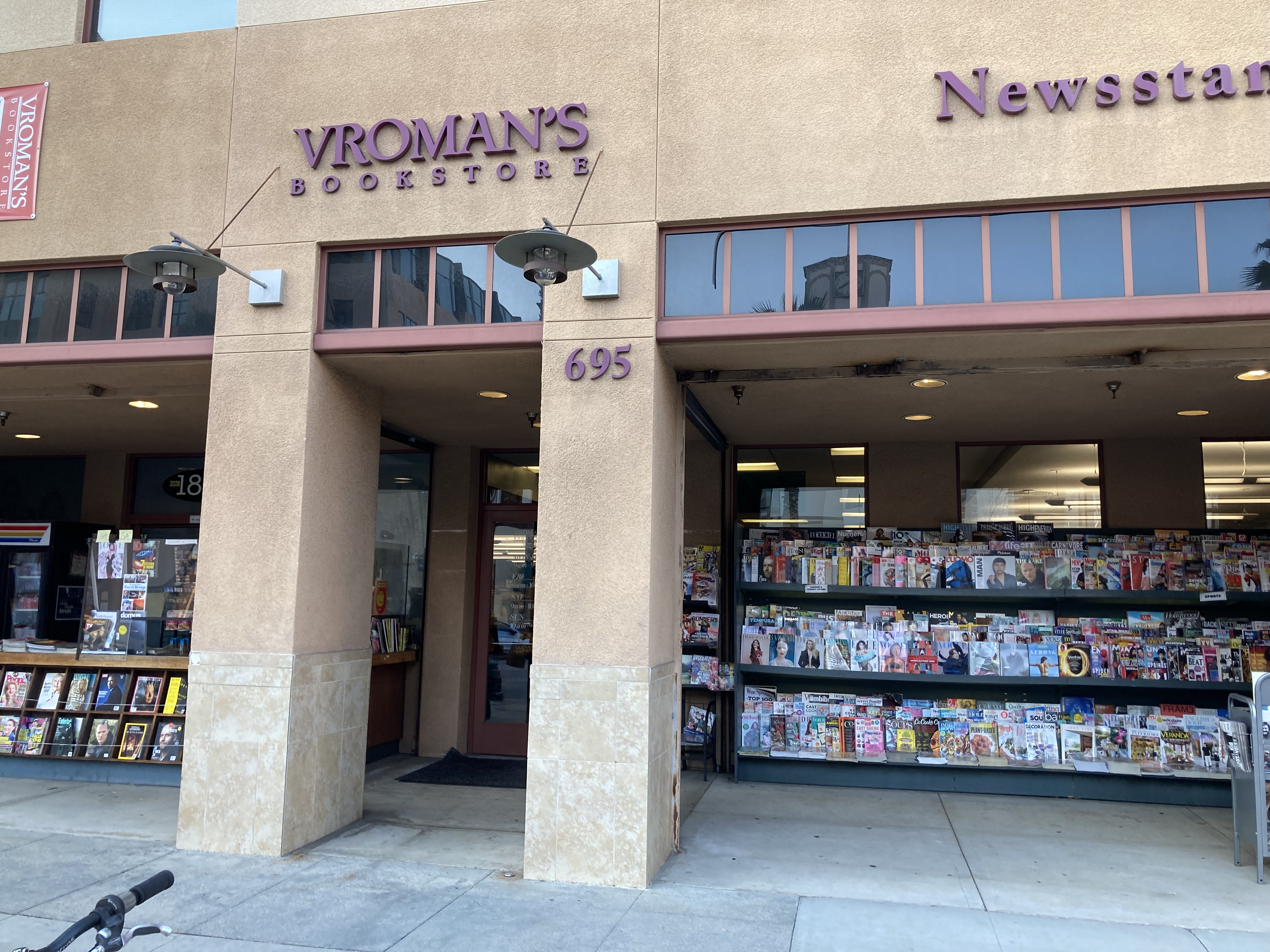
Vroman's Bookstore

After a two-year search, Sheldon announced that he sold Vroman’s and Book Soup to Pasadena native Robert Hoffman.
