= Book Soup =

Bookstore in West Hollywood, California

Coordinates: 34.0905°N 118.3838°W

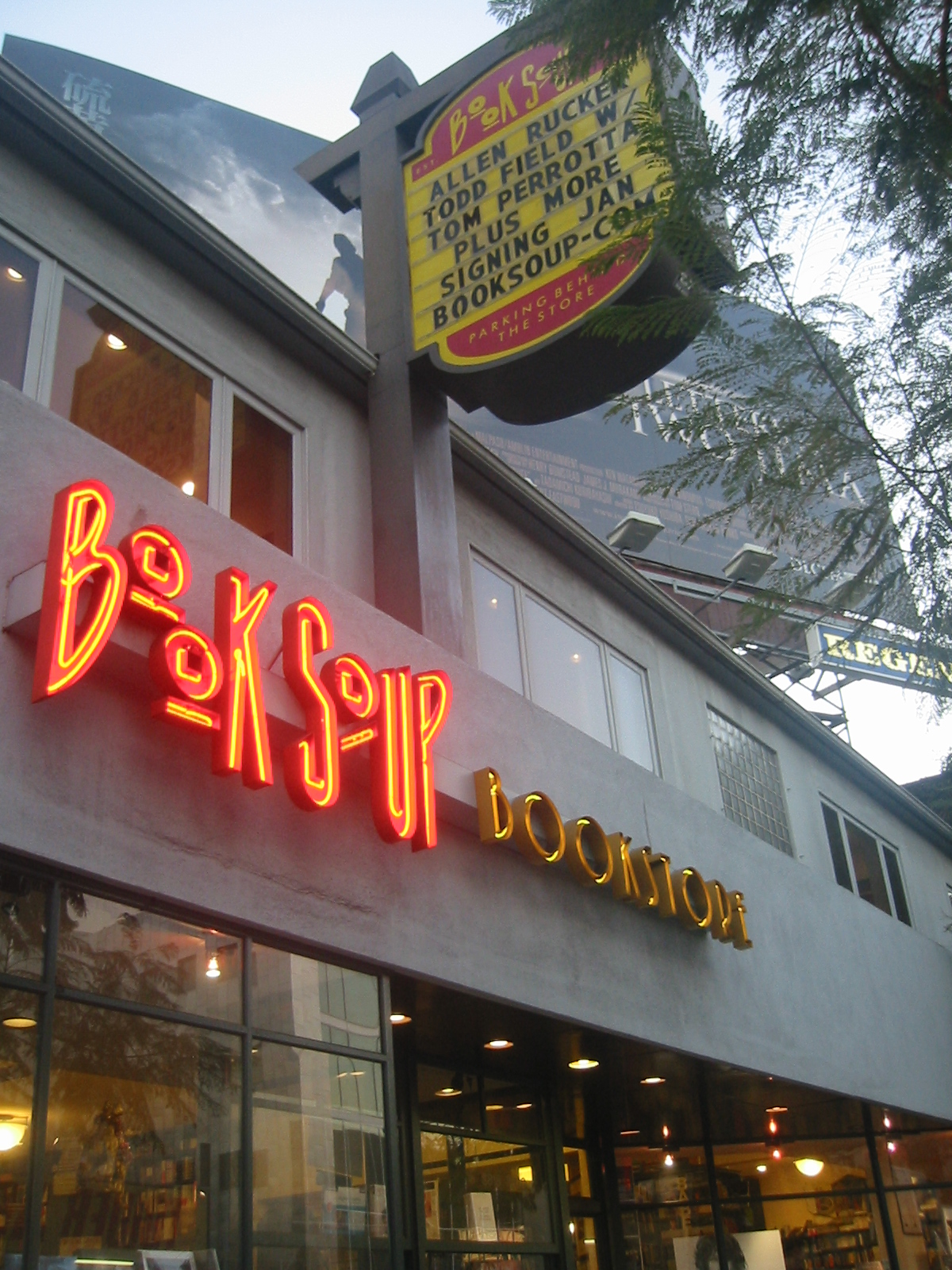
- Type: Private
- Industry: Retail
- Founded: 1975
- Founder: Glenn Goldman
- Headquarters: West Hollywood, California
- Products: Books
- Website: www.booksoup.com

Book Soup is an independent bookstore located at 8818 Sunset Boulevard in West Hollywood, California, and is the largest general interest independent bookstore in Hollywood. Popular with many in the entertainment industry, the store continues to hosts events featuring a variety of celebrity authors who have so far included Muhammad Ali, Howard Stern, Annie Leibovitz, Chuck Palahniuk, Jenna Jameson, Hunter S. Thompson, Norman Mailer, and The Doors. Considered a "cultural fixture" of the Sunset Strip, Book Soup has also been featured as a location in a number of films and television shows.

== History ==
The store was founded in 1975 by Glenn Goldman and David Mackler (both in graduate school at UCLA at the time) raised $50,000 and, after doing extensive research on where to locate their store, opened Book Soup on Sunset Boulevard. The rationale for the location, as Goldman explained, was that there "had been a period of upheaval here in the '60s—of thought and ideas—and I felt that the people who lived in the neighborhood would and could really support a bookstore." Book Soup (the name was the least-offensive of those proposed by Goldman and Mackler) was nestled between a head shop and strip club. Mackler designed the store's interior.

The store and its staff of two (which included Goldman) struggled for two decades to run a profit. It nearly closed early in its existence, but a publisher's representative helped the store re-establish its credit line and saved the business. In 1985, Book Soup again nearly closed, but another publisher's representative loaned it the money to stay afloat. Book Soup added a storefront newsstand, "News Mews," and began selling thousands of domestic and international periodicals and newspapers. In the late 1980s, Book Soup moved two blocks further down Sunset Boulevard to its current, more spacious location and expanded to 50,000 titles. It also began earning a reputation for art, photography, film and music books as well as for hosting high-profile events featuring authors and celebrities such as Gore Vidal, James Ellroy, Mikal Gilmore, Edward Albee, Robert Wagner, and Tom Stoppard.

A second Book Soup store at South Coast Plaza in Costa Mesa, California, opened in 2002 but closed in 2007 due to high rent and the impact of competition from Amazon.com and large discount chain stores such as Wal-Mart and Target.

As of July 2017 there is a branch of Book Soup in the departure lounge of the Tom Bradley International Terminal at Los Angeles airport.

Goldman announced he was selling Book Soup on January 2, 2009, then died of pancreatic cancer on January 3, 2009. Vroman's Bookstore and Book Soup signed an agreement October 9, 2009, to purchase Book Soup.

== Publicity stunts ==
Book Soup hosts author readings on an almost daily basis. The store is well known for its many publicity stunts, some staged by authors and some staged by the store to attract customers. Among the more notable are:

- Emma Watson surprised guests joining friend and author Stephen Chbosky for his latest release, Imaginary Friend
- Nicole Richie joined Sasha Sagan in conversation for Sasha's book, For Small Creatures Such as We
- For a book reading by Paris Hilton, Hilton's publicist hired protesters to picket the store with signs stating "Read a book, don't write one."
- After the United Kingdom banned Peter Wright's nonfiction exposé Spy Catcher, Book Soup ran an ad in Private Eye magazine that stated "Banned in Britain. Available in America." The store sold 3,000 copies of the book in the next three weeks.
- When a fatwa was issued condemning Salman Rushdie's The Satanic Verses, Goldman wrote a ransom note to the Los Angeles Times declaring that freedom of speech was being held hostage. Rupert Murdoch wrote Goldman a letter praising his "ransom note."
- When the National Organization for Women (NOW) strongly criticized Bret Easton Ellis's 1991 novel American Psycho for glamorizing and condoning rape, Book Soup put fliers into its copies of the novel, blasting NOW for drawing attention to the book and disclaiming any approval of the novel's content. The store sold 18 copies of the book in 24 hours.

== In popular culture ==
• During her one-woman show, Letting Go of God, Julia Sweeney states that she bought Karen Armstrong's A History of God at Book Soup.

• Singing sister duo, Aly and AJ’s photoshoot for their EP Ten Years & promotional tour photos were taken in the parking lot.

• The bookstore serves as a location in the 2012 film Celeste and Jesse Forever.
