= Fernando Soleti =

Italian general

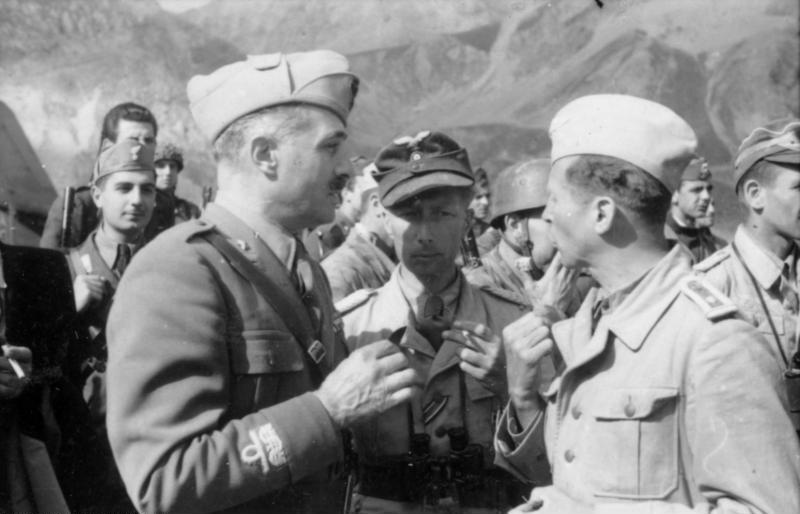
- General Soleti (left) with Major Harald Mors during the Gran Sasso raid
- Born: 10 May 1891; Rome, Kingdom of Italy
- Died: 31 March 1978 (aged 86); Rome, Italy
- Military career
- Allegiance: Kingdom of Italy; Italy
- Branch: Royal Italian Army; Italian Police
- Rank: Lieutenant General
- Conflicts: World War I; Battle of Caporetto; World War II; Operation Achse; Gran Sasso raid
- Awards: Silver Medal of Military Valor (twice)

Fernando Soleti (Rome, 10 May 1891 – 31 March 1978) was an Italian general during World War II, mostly known for his involvement in the Gran Sasso raid.

== Biography ==
During the First World War he fought as a lieutenant in the "Piemonte Cavalleria" Regiment, earning two silver medals for military valor for rearguard actions following the battle of Caporetto. During the interwar period he was transferred to the Italian State Police, and in 1943 he was a police general, inspector of the Metropolitan Police Corps of Rome. On 25 July 1943 he participated in the arrest of Benito Mussolini following his fall from power, and on the following day he personally halted a shootout that had broken out between some Blackshirts and armed civilians near a DICAT barracks in Rome. Following the proclamation of the Armistice of Cassibile, he participated in the brief fighting to defend Rome from the Germans, and after the fall of the capital he was arrested by the SS and unsuccessfully attempted suicide. On 12 September 1943 he was forced by SS-Hauptsturmführer Otto Skorzeny to join him as a hostage on one of the gliders that carried German paratroopers to Campo Imperatore, on the Gran Sasso, where Mussolini had been imprisoned. Upon arriving at the hotel where Mussolini was being kept, Soleti ordered to the policemen and carabinieri who guarded the dictator to hold their fire, enabling the bloodless liberation of the dictator. He was forced to go to Germany and later was released by the Germans and went into hiding until the liberation of Rome by the Allies. After the war he remained in service at the Italian Ministry of the Interior until his retirement in 1956.
