= Patricia Beck =

American writer

- Born: April 8, 1924; New York City
- Died: March 2, 1978 (aged 53)
- Education: Bennington College
- Occupation: Writer
- Spouse: Thomas Maulding
- Writing career
- Language: English
- Genre: Short story

Patricia Beck (April 8, 1924 – March 2, 1978) was an American writer from New York state. She studied at Bennington College in Bennington, Vermont but dropped out after her mother's death. Beck kept a diary, wrote poetry, and published two short stories before committing suicide in 1978. Her papers were selected for inclusion in the Smith College women and disabilities collection, as they provide insight into chronic illness and depression.

== Early life and education ==
On April 8, 1924, Patricia Beck was born in Hell's Kitchen, New York City, New York, the third of four children. In 1933, Beck's mother remarried after her father's death in 1926, and from 1934 to 1938, the family relocated and lived in various locations around Europe. Beck was exposed to an idiosyncratic lifestyle through her mother's second marriage to the boxer, Paul George Swiderski. Beck, a Catholic, attended a convent school, was allowed only limited autonomy, and was not exposed to the typical peer culture of American middle-class high school students. With the outbreak of the Spanish Civil War, the family relocated back to the United States, where Beck finished her secondary education before enrolling at Bennington College.

Beck began to study writing, art, and psychology at Bennington under Theodore Roethke, W. H. Auden, and Allan Seager. In 1945, she described a self-consciousness related to a friendship she had developed with a faculty member's wife. Depression played a role in the following year, when Beck's personal life interfered with her education and felt compelled to leave school, her mother having died from cancer during her freshman year. After a stay in the psychiatric unit at Albany Hospital, she spent some time in Buzzards Bay, Massachusetts, before returning to Bennington. Later instructors there included Bernard Malamud, with whose family she became close and whose daughter she taught to drive.

== Career ==
Beck kept diaries from the age of fourteen until her death, and she wrote other works throughout her life. However, only two short stories, "A Promise in the Wind" and "Come Down to the Willow," were published while she was living. A volume of her short stories, A Gift of Kindling and Other Stories, was published posthumously. She wrote her first diary entry on 18 September 1938, at the age of fourteen, and her final entry was made just one week before she took her own life. Her papers – including correspondence, manuscripts, semi-autobiographical novels, poems, personal diaries, and notebooks – are held by Smith College in the Women and Disabilities section of the Sophia Smith Collection. Much of the work was unpublished during her lifetime and provides rare insight into chronic illness and depression.

Bernard Malamud said that he felt Beck was not meant to be a writer. She used the hundreds of rejection letters she received from such magazines as The New Yorker and The Saturday Evening Post as wallpaper for her bathroom.

== Personal life ==
On June 28, 1952, Beck married Thomas Maulding, a blind man, and moved to New York City before purchasing a home, "Birdland", in North Bennington, Vermont in 1954. In 1958, she became pregnant, but miscarried. The couple divorced after that. Beck remained in "Birdland" and returned to Bennington College and continued her studies. She was diagnosed with diabetes for most of her life, and between 1976 and 1977, both of her legs were amputated due to complications. She was treated with shock therapy as part of psychological treatment. On March 2, 1978, Beck died by suicide when she took an insulin overdose. She was 53 years old.

== Sources ==
- Faehmel, Babette (8 September 2011). College Women In The Nuclear Age: Cultural Literacy and Female Identity, 1940–1960. Rutgers University Press. ISBN 978-0-8135-5319-1.
