= Wu Yunfang =

Chinese politician

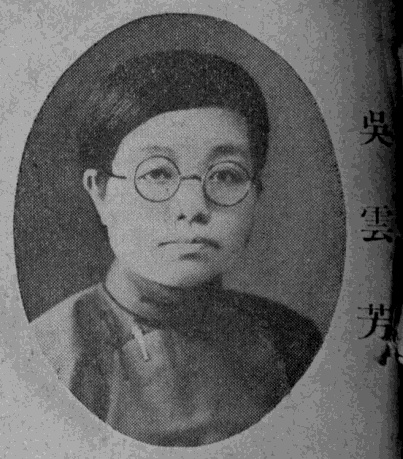

Member of the Legislative Yuan
- In office 1948–1963
- Constituency: Shaanxi

Personal details
- Born: 1896; Nanzheng District, China
- Died: 9 March 1978; Xi'an, China

Wu Yunfang (Chinese: 吳雲芳, 1896 – 9 March 1978) was a Chinese educator and politician. She was among the first group of women elected to the Legislative Yuan in 1948.

== Biography ==
Wu was born in Nanzheng District in Shaanxi province in 1896. She entered Shaanxi Women's Normal School in 1911, before attending the Department of Machine Weaving at National Peking Women's Higher Normal School. She subsequently taught at a primary school and became director of the vocational department of Xi'an Women's Normal School.

In 1928 she founded the Shaanxi Women's Vocational Education Promotion Association and the Civilian Women's Vocational School, becoming its headteacher. The following year she became head of Xi'an Women's Teachers School, a role she held until 1931 when she resigned to concentrate on her Vocational School. After the outbreak of the Second Sino-Japanese War she sent her students to form weaving production cooperatives to teach women how to operate pedal looms to support the war effort. She married Song Liankui, a politician.

Following the war, Wu became a member of the Shaanxi Provincial Senate in September 1946. She was a candidate in Shaanxi in the 1948 elections for the Legislative Yuan and was elected to parliament. After being elected, she sat on the Education and Culture Committee, the Food Policy Committee and the Political and Local Autonomy Committee. She remained in China following the Chinese Civil War and studied at Northwest People's Revolutionary University. After graduating, she became head of Xi'an Jiefangmen Leisure Culture School.

In 1954 she joined the Revolutionary Committee of the Chinese Kuomintang and the following year became a member of the party's provincial committee. She was also a member of the first four Xi'an Chinese People's Political Consultative Conference and a member of the fourth Shaanxi provincial CPPCC. She died in Xi'an in March 1978.
