= Maurice Wood (cricketer) =

English cricketer

Maurice Wood (6 July 1933 – 18 March 1978) was an English first-class cricketer active 1954–55 who played for Nottinghamshire. He was born and died in Nottingham.
