= School Mathematics Study Group =

The School Mathematics Study Group (SMSG) was an American academic think tank focused on the subject of reform in mathematics education. Directed by Edward G. Begle and financed by the National Science Foundation, the group was created in 1958 in the wake of the Sputnik crisis and tasked with creating and implementing mathematics curricula for primary and secondary education, which it did until its termination in 1977.

The efforts of the SMSG yielded a reform in mathematics education known as New Math which was promulgated in a series of reports, culminating in a series published by Random House called the New Mathematical Library (Vol. 1 is Ivan Niven's Numbers: Rational and Irrational). In the early years, SMSG also produced a set of draft textbooks in typewritten paperback format for elementary, middle and high school students.

Perhaps the most authoritative collection of materials from the School Mathematics Study Group is now housed in the Archives of American Mathematics in the University of Texas at Austin's Center for American History.

== See also ==
- Foundations of geometry
