= Odette Keun =

Dutch socialist, journalist and writer

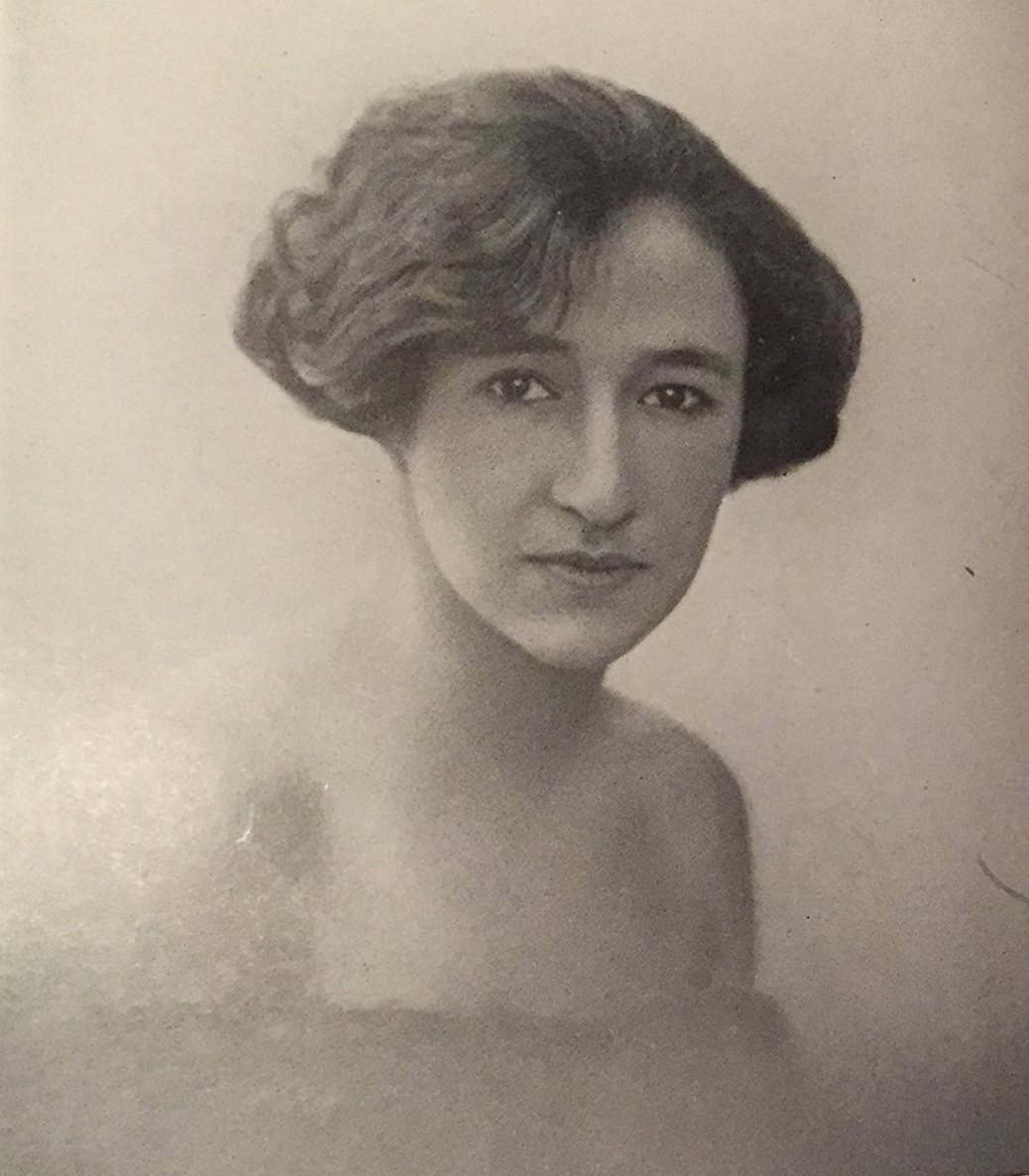
Odette Keun (c.1923)

Odette Zoé Keun (10 September 1888 in Pera – 14 March 1978 in Worthing) was a Dutch socialist, journalist and writer, who traveled extensively in Europe, including the Caucasus and the early Soviet Union.

== Early years ==
Keun was the daughter of Gustave Henri Keun, at the time first dragoman and secretary of the Dutch consulate in the Ottoman Empire, and his second wife, Helene Lauro, who was of Italian/Greek ancestry. When her father died in 1902, the family was left in relatively impoverished state. She became rebellious and her mother sent her to an Ursuline boarding school in the Netherlands. After three years she had decided to become a nun and moved to a Dominican monastery in Tours. She resigned two years later and went back to Istanbul. She could no longer find herself in the dogma of the church, the role of the Dominicans in the fight against the Cathars, and, last but not least, celibacy. There was also the more practical reason; after her mother's death, she was the source of support for her sisters. She published her first book "Les Maisons sur le Sable" (1914) in which she described her farewell to the faith, her views on social problems, and her amorous wishes.

== Love and secret services ==
The first World War brought her to Paris. She worked for the Red Cross in Rouen. At that time, several secret services were interested in her because she expressed strong criticism of British and French colonial politics. After falling in love with him, she traveled to her lover Bernard Lavergne who settled in Algiers. She traveled into the desert on horseback and contributed to health care for the Berbers. Her social involvement was further demonstrated by her call for the Berbers to demand better facilities. A new lover, the Georgian prince Grisha, led her to Georgia. She wrote about this trip and her affair in her book Au Pays de la Toison d’Or (1924). In late spring 1921, while staying with friends in Istanbul and two days before she would have travelled to Batum, she was arrested by the British military police, extrajudicially and presumably for her socialist leanings, and was deported to Sebastopol in Russia. For three months she endured the abuses of the Cheka, before she was let go to Kharkov. She wrote about her arrest and experiences in Russia in Sous Lénine. Notes d’Une Femme Déporté en Russie par les Anglais (Paris 1922).

== Wells and the search for a third way ==
She wanted to return to Istanbul but because of the turbulent events this city was no longer an option, so she returned to Paris. Between 1924 and 1933 Keun was the partner of H. G. Wells, with whom she lived in Lou Pidou, a house they built together in Grasse, France. Wells, who was 22 years her elder, dedicated his books The World of William Clissold (his longest) and The Bulpington of Blup to her. Later she worked as secretary at the consul-general in the United States. In her 1937 book A Foreigner Looks at the TVA, she describes the organization of George W. Norris's Tennessee Valley Authority as "the way in which a participatory liberal democracy could embrace modernization, to parry the influence of Fascist and Communist models of development, while avoiding the perils of statism." After 1939 Keun lived in England, first in London, from 1941 in Torquay, and eventually in Worthing, West Sussex.

== Publications ==
In her time, Odette was an established and recognized author, with a long list of publications, including:

- Les Maisons sur le Sable (Sansot), 1914
- Mesdemoiselles Daisne de Constantinople (Sansot), 1917
- Les Oasis dans la Montagne (Calmann-Lévy), 1920
- Une Femme Moderne (Flammarion), 1921
- Sous Lénine; notes d'une femme déportée en Russie par les Anglais (Flammarion), 1922
  - My Adventures in Bolshevik Russia (Bodley Head), 1923 (English translation by the author)
- Au Pays de la Toison d’Or (Flammarion)
  - In the Land of the Golden Fleece, through independent menchevist Georgia (Bodley Head) 1924 (English translation by Jessiman)
- The Man Who Never Understood (Bodley Head) (published anonymously)
- Prince Tariel: a story of Georgia (Cape), 1925
  - Prins Tariel (Dutch translation by V.d.Horst) (Arbeiderspers), 1926
  - Le Prince Tariel (French translation by. Fouret) (Malfère), 1927
- La Capitulation (Malfère), 1929
- Dans l'Aurès inconnu: soleil, pierres et guelâas (Malfère), 1930
- A Foreigner Looks at the British Sudan (Faber & Faber), 1930
- I Discover the English (Bodley Head), 1934
- Darkness from the North (Brinton), 1935
- A Foreigner Looks at the TVA (Longmans & Co), 1937
- I Think Aloud in America (Longmans & Co), 1939
- And Hell Followed ... A European ally interprets the war for ordinary people like herself (Constable & Co), 1942
- Trumpets Bray (Constable & Co), 1943
- Continental Stakes; Marshes of Invasion, Valley of Conquest and Peninsula of Chaos (Br. Cont. Syndicate), 1944
- Soliloquy on some Matters of Interest to the Author (Keun), 1960

A biography of Odette Keun was written by Monique Reintjes, and first published in Amsterdam in 2000.
