= Adam Clark Vroman =

American photographer (1856–1916)

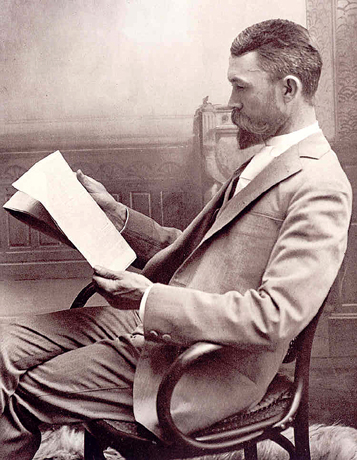
- Born: April 15, 1856; Lasalle, Illinois, United States
- Died: July 24, 1916 (aged 60); Altadena, California, United States
- Occupations: Photographer and bookseller

Adam Clark Vroman (April 15, 1856 – July 24, 1916) was an American portrait photographer, known primarily for his portraits of indigenous peoples of the Southwestern United States. He was the founder and proprietor of Vroman's Bookstore – the oldest and largest independent bookshop in Southern California.

He originally worked for the railways in various positions. In 1892 he began taking landscape photographs, then opened a bookstore in Pasadena together with J.S. Glassock. From 1895, he visited the villages of the Hopi Native Americans for ten years, which he painted. In addition, he photographed the Navajo tribe. Later he also lectured on Indigenous Americans

In his photographs, he showed their facial features, but also realistic images of their dwellings and arranged simple genre scenes of their way of life. In the portrait, he combined documentary requirements with a cultivated rendering.

== Vroman's Bookstore ==
Vroman's Bookstore was founded by Adam Clark Vroman in 1894. It was then called Vroman's Book and Photographic Supply and was located at 60 East Colorado Boulevard in Pasadena, California. Vroman was an avid photographer of the Southwest and Native American culture, and his interest in photographic equipment began a long-standing portfolio tradition in his bookstore.

== Gallery ==
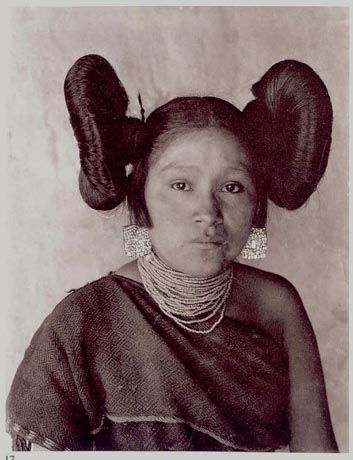
Young Hopi woman, ca 1886

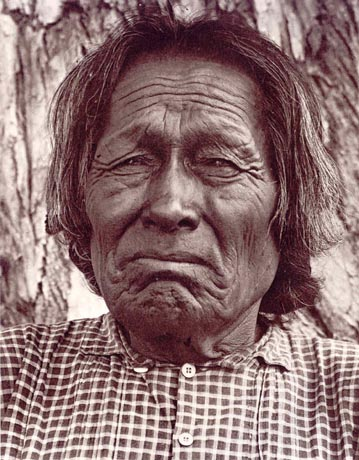
Native American elder

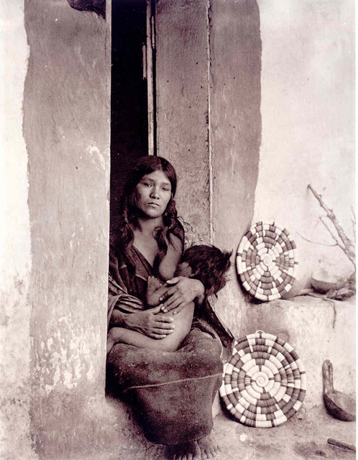

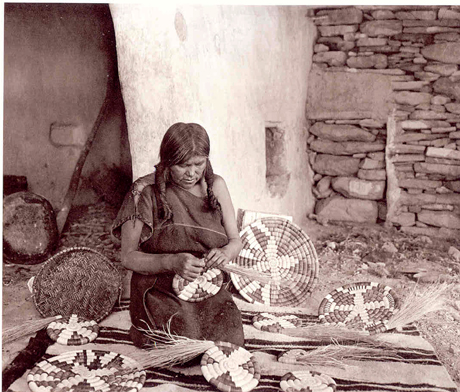

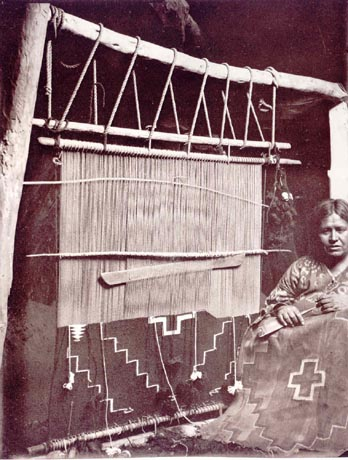

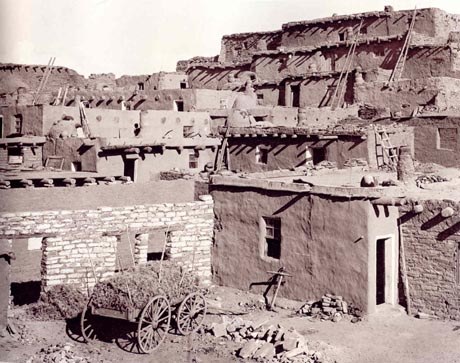

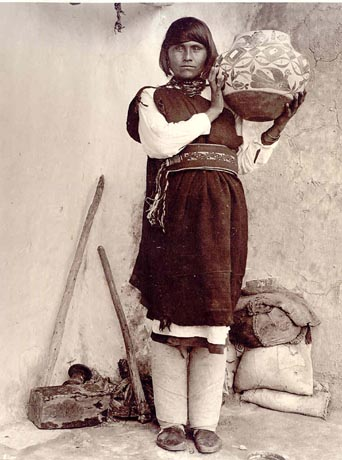

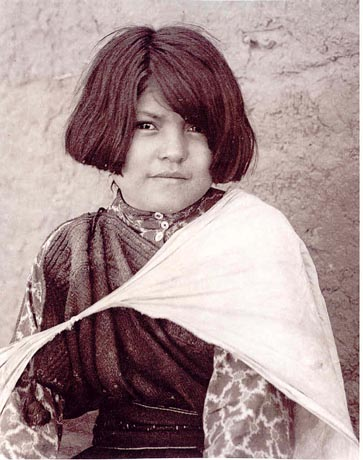
