= Edward G. Begle =

American mathematician

- Born: November 27, 1914; Saginaw, Michigan
- Died: March 2, 1978 (aged 63); Palo Alto, California
- Education: Princeton (Ph.D.); Michigan (A.B., M.A.)
- Scientific career
- Fields: Mathematics
- Workplaces: School Mathematics Study Group
- Thesis: Locally Connected Spaces and Generalized Manifolds (1940)
- Doctoral advisor: Solomon Lefschetz

Edward Griffith Begle (November 27, 1914 – March 2, 1978) was a mathematician best known for his role as the director of the School Mathematics Study Group (SMSG), the primary group credited for developing what came to be known as The New Math. Begle was a topologist and a researcher in mathematics education who served as a member of the faculty of Stanford University, Princeton University, The University of Michigan, and Yale University. Begle was also elected as the secretary of the American Mathematical Society in 1951, and he held the position for 6 years.

== Biography ==
Edward G. Begle was born November 27, 1914, in Saginaw, Michigan. Studying at the University of Michigan, Begle earned his A.B. in Mathematics in 1936 and his M.A. in 1938. Begle's early academic work was in the field of topology, which is where he earned his Ph.D. at Princeton, studying under Solomon Lefschetz in 1940. While Begle's contributions to the field of mathematical research are limited, among them is the first proof of the Vietoris theorem, which caused it to become commonly known as the Vietoris–Begle mapping theorem.

Begle departed Princeton a year after completing his doctorate to spend a year as a Fellow of the National Research Council, after which he joined the faculty of Yale in 1942. Begle's interest in mathematics education is apparent in his early mathematics texts, where the writing departs from the tradition at the time of writing textbooks addressed to accomplished mathematicians. Instead, Begle's introductory mathematics texts actually address freshman mathematicians, a revolutionary concept in teaching math. As Begle's stature increased as an educator within the field of mathematics, he gained notice within his field and was elected secretary of the American Mathematical Society in 1951.

In the wake of Sputnik in 1958, Begle gained the directorship of the School Mathematics Study Group, a post he would hold for 15 years. Under his leadership, the SMSG published numerous reports and studies, culminating in its series of books detailing the teaching revolution known as The New Math. It was in this capacity that in 1961, Begle took on an appointment as professor in the School of Education at Stanford as well as a courtesy appointment in the Stanford Department of Mathematics. Also in 1961, Begle was awarded with the Mathematical Association of America's highest honor: The Award for Distinguished Service to Mathematics.

At the time of his death in 1978, Begle was working on a compilation of the results of his 15-year tenure as the director of the SMSG and a culmination of his lifetime of experience in mathematics education. Published posthumously in 1979, Critical Variables in Mathematics Education: Findings from a Survey of the Empirical Literature was listed by the National Council of Teachers of Mathematics as Begle's most influential work.

== Bibliography ==
- 1951 Introductory calculus, with analytic geometry, Holt, Rinehart and Winston, revised edition 1960, Holt, Rinehart and Winston
- 1955 Freshman mathematics at Yale University, (National Science Foundation), Oklahoma Agricultural and Mechanical College
- 1955 Lectures on experimental programs in collegiate mathematics, (National Science Foundation), Oklahoma Agricultural and Mechanical College
- 1964 Cooperative research project no. F-037: Final report. I. Conference on Mathematics Education for Below Average Achievers. II. Writing experience for potential ... participation in a group writing project, Stanford University Press
- 1971 Calculus, Holt, Rinehart and Winston
- 1972 Teacher knowledge and student achievement in algebra, School Mathematics Study Group
- 1972 Teacher effectiveness in mathematics instruction (NLSMA reports), Available from A.C. Vroman
- 1972 The prediction of mathematics achievement (NLSMA reports), Available from A.C. Vroman
- 1975 The mathematics of the elementary school, McGraw-Hill
- 1979 Critical Variables in Mathematics Education: Findings from a Survey of the Empirical Literature, Mathematical Association of America
