= Edith R Dick =

Canadian Army nurse (1906–1978)

Edith Rainsford Dick (1 March 1906 – 29 March 1978) was a Canadian nurse who served with the Royal Canadian Army Medical Corps for World War II as a Major Matron. She was a recipient of the Royal Red Cross First Class Award.

== Biography ==
Dick was born in Milton, Ontario on 1 March 1906 to W.I. Dick and Margaret Young, one of nine children. She attended her early schooling in Milton. Dick went to the University of Toronto for a Bachelor of Arts for two years, which she left to enroll in the Johns Hopkins School of Nursing. She returned from Johns Hopkins to Canada to finish her Bachelor's degree at the University of Toronto, which she then completed a Certificate in Public Health Nursing from the University.

Dick became Assistant Superintendent of the Ontario Hospital in Whitby in 1932. She became the Superintendent of Nurses for the Toronto Psychiatric Hospital in 1934, following her role at the New Toronto Hospital the previous year. In 1935, Dick applied to the Nursing Branch of the Ontario Department of Health, becoming the Inspector of Schools of Nursing for Ontario.

She served in World War II as a major matron in two Canadian hospitals established in both England and France. After her service, Dick was awarded the Royal Red Cross First Class Award by King George VI in 1948.

Dick was inducted into the Milton Walk of Fame in 2014 for her influence on Canadian nursing standards.
