= Friederike Koderitsch =

Dutch fencer (1894–1978)

Personal information
- Born: 18 May 1894 The Hague, Netherlands
- Died: 3 March 1978 (aged 83) The Hague, Netherlands

Sport
- Sport: Fencing

Friederike Koderitsch (18 May 1894 – 3 March 1978) was a Dutch fencer. She competed in the women's individual foil event at the 1928 Summer Olympics.
