= Umberto Fiore =

Italian politician and trade unionist (1896–1978)

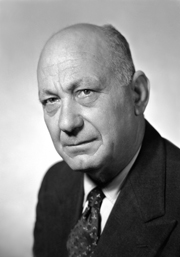

Member of the Constituent Assembly of Italy
- In office 1946–1948
- In office 1948–1968

Member of the Senate of the Republic

Personal details
- Born: 12 May 1896
- Died: 14 March 1978 (aged 81)
- Party: Italian Communist Party
- Education: Technical School

Military service
- Allegiance: Royal Italian Army
- Branch/service: Army
- Rank: Officer
- Unit: 1st Genie Regiment

Umberto Fiore (12 May 1896 – 14 March 1978) was an Italian politician and trade unionist.

== Biography ==
Umberto Fiore was born in Giampilieri, a fraction of Messina, in 1896. Having survived the 1908 earthquake, his father enrolled him in a technical school in Caltanissetta. He returned to Messina after completing his studies and, in 1913, organized the first youth socialist groups in the city.

At the outbreak of the First World War, he was drafted as an officer in the 1st Genie Regiment. His socialist propaganda activity continued in the trenches, and due to these actions, he was sentenced to seven years in prison, with the obligation to return to the front lines. Here he was injured in 1917 during the Eleventh Battle of the Isonzo. Discharged and amnestied, he returned to Messina; in 1921 he joined the Communist Party of Italy

In August of the same year, he moved to Milan for work, continuing the trade unionist activity he had developed in Sicily. In 1922, he was appointed editor-in-chief of the communist sheet "The Red Union". In 1923, he was forced to emigrate to France following the fascist intimidation he suffered in those years. He found refuge in Paris, where he continued in the anti-regime propaganda activity. In contrast to the French communists, due to its position close to Trotskyism, it returned to Italy, to its hometown. He was arrested in 1926 by the OVRA, sent initially to confinement and subsequently sentenced in 1928 to an eight-year prison sentence. The amnesty of 1932 allowed him the reduction of sentence; released from prison, he continued in subversive action against the fascist regime.

At the outbreak of the Second World War, he was deported to the Lacedonia prison camp, where he remained until the signing of the armistice in September 1943. At the end of the conflict, he became a member of the National Council and was appointed undersecretary to the Ministry of Industry and Commerce in the Bonomi III Cabinet, with Giovanni Gronchi as Minister. Elected deputy to the Constituent Assembly, he was Senator by right in the I legislature (1948–53) for the discounted prison term; subsequently, he was re-elected to the Senate until the 4th legislature, keeping the seat until 1968.

In 1973, he wrote the song "Rossa Palestina," an anti-Zionist and pro-Palestinian song about the struggle of Palestinians in the Levant and Palestine.

== Bibliography ==
- Giuseppe Masi, FIORE, Umberto, in Dizionario biografico degli italiani, vol. 48, Roma, Istituto dell'Enciclopedia Italiana, 1997. URL consultato il 7 gennaio 2018.
