= Raoul Petouille =

French cyclist

Personal information
- Born: 3 January 1894
- Died: 4 March 1978 (aged 84)

Cycling career
- Sport: Cycling
- Role: Rider

Raoul Petouille (3 January 1894 – 4 March 1978) was a French racing cyclist. He rode in the 1921 Tour de France.
