= Frank Elworthy =

South African cricketer (1893–1978)

Personal information
- Full name: Frank William Elworthy
- Born: 11 June 1893; Cambridge, England
- Died: 15 March 1978 (aged 84); Johannesburg, Transvaal, South Africa
- Batting: Left-handed
- Bowling: Right-arm leg-break googly

Domestic team information
- Years: Team
- 1912/13–1929/30: Transvaal

Career statistics
Competition	First-class
Matches	14
Runs scored	171
Batting average	12.21
100s/50s	0/0
Top score	44
Balls bowled	1785
Wickets	42
Bowling average	26.97
5 wickets in innings	2
10 wickets in match	0
Best bowling	6/60
Catches/stumpings	3/–
- Source: Cricinfo, 16 April 2023

Frank William Elworthy (11 June 1893 – 15 March 1978) was a South African cricketer who played first-class cricket for Transvaal between 1913 and 1930.

A right-arm leg-spin bowler noted for his googlies, Elworthy made his first-class debut in March 1913 aged 19 against Griqualand West, taking 5 for 87 in the first innings.

Elworthy's best first-class figures were 6 for 60 in Transvaal's victory over Border in the 1920–21 Currie Cup. He played for South Africa in the first of the two matches against the Australian Imperial Force Touring XI in November 1919, but with little success.
