= Luke Brown (footballer, born 1902) =

Australian rules footballer, born 1902

Personal information
- Full name: Luke Brown
- Born: 20 January 1902
- Died: 6 March 1978 (aged 76)
- Height: 173 cm (5 ft 8 in)

Playing career^{1}
Years	Club	Games (Goals)
1926	Fitzroy	1 (0)
- ^{1} Playing statistics correct to the end of 1926.

Luke Brown (20 January 1902 – 6 March 1978) was an Australian rules footballer who played with Fitzroy in the Victorian Football League (VFL).
