= Gherardo Del Colle =

Italian priest, poet and journalist (1920–1978)

Gherardo del Colle, pseudonym of father Gherardo Paolo da Cesino, born Paolo Repetto (26 February 1920 – 20 March 1978), was an Italian Franciscan Capuchin friar, poet, writer and journalist.

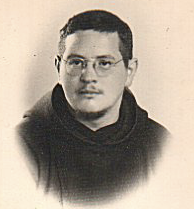
Gherardo del Colle

== Biography ==
Gherardo del Colle was born as Paolo Repetto in Cesino, a neighborhood of Genoa on 26 February 1920 from Giovanni and Rosa Repetto.

He joined the seminary of the Order of Friars Minor Capuchin in Genoa Campi, where he received the religious habit on 14 agosto 1935. In 1942, he made the perpetual religious vows and was ordained a priest. He taught Italian literature for thirty years in the Philosophical School of the Capuchins in Savona. He conducted his priestly ministry in several convents of the Ligurian province of the Capuchins, including Pontedecimo, Madonna delle Grazie di Voltri, Varazze, Savona, Voltaggio e Genoa San Bernardino. He was also the chaplain of San Martino Hospital in Genoa.

He was a poet, writer, playwright, journalist and collaborator of literary magazines. He began writing poetry at an early age and published several collections, including: “Rosso di Sera” (1946), “Biancospino” (1957), “Sotto la Gronda” (1964), “L’Angelo dei Suburbi” (1971) e “Poesie 1937–1970” (1975). As a playwright, he wrote in both Italian and Ligurian languages. As a journalist, he collaborated with L'Osservatore Romano, for which he published over 120 articles on ethics and literary criticism, and with the Genoese newspapers Il Cittadino and Il Corriere Mercantile. He also wrote texts illustrated strips for children, published in the magazine Lo Scolaro.

He was a friend and correspondent of poets Giorgio Caproni and Angelo Barile, as well as numerous other Italian intellectuals, including Salvatore Quasimodo, Ettore Serra and Eugenio Montale.

He died at the Andrea Gallino Hospital in Pontedecimo on 20 March 1978.

== Poetics and style ==
Gherardo Del Colle's poetry is characterized by complexity and depth, embracing not only religious themes but also social and contemporary issues. Some of his texts reveal a strong sense of indignation and compassion, while others express anger and dismay at the hatred and wickedness of modern society. Del Colle is appreciated by literary critics for his ability to celebrate life in all its facets, from joys to sorrows, with sincerity and authenticity. His poems, which range from praise to God to inner reflection and suffering for world events, show a rigorous stylistic approach.

In his plays, both in Italian and Ligurian languages, he takes original inspiration from Achille Campanile and the early Eugène Ionesco. From them, he adopts a unique verbal humor, paradoxical plots, condensed actions, illogical situations and amusing characters. References to Campanile can be seen in the futurist irony, brief gags and the parody of everyday conversation. The jokes of Campanile and Ionesco are similar to those of Del Colle. Del Colle's theater is characterized by nonsense, wordplay, paradoxes, refined humor and elegant wit.

== Works ==
A partial chronological list of Gherardo del Colle's works includes:

- Nelle strade dei bimbi: (1938–1941), Genova, 1942.
- Rosso di sera, Genova, Del Gallo, 1946.
- All'affanno del tempo: liriche, confidenziale di Gherardo del Colle, Bergamo, Baldamenti, 1952 (con Dino Carlesi).
- L' anello di santa Caterina: azione sacra in tre parti, Varazze, 1957.
- Biancospino, Vicenza, La Locusta, 1957.
- Lauda natalizia del 1600, a cura di Gherardo Del Colle, disegno di Gisberto Ceracchini, S.l., 1960.
- Peccóu veniale: (lamenti, pentimenti e patimenti, cômme commenti e cômme avvertimenti ä vitta spirituale di Conventi), Voltri, s.n., 1962.
- Critica, Liguria, 1964.
- Sotto la gronda, Vicenza, La locusta, 1965.
- Corso speciale, Liguria, 1966.
- La poesia russa del Novecento, le traduzioni, ove non si dica altrimenti, sono di Angelo Maria Ripellino, Savona, 1966–1967.
- Schediario (serie 1–5), Savona, 1967.
- Peccóu veniale, oscïa Lamenti, pentimenti e patimenti comme commenti e comme avvertimenti ä vitta spirituale di conventi; tersa ristampa (e sempre fâeta a man]) però co-e novitâe di disegni de Luiggi Caldanzan e d'ûn Dixzionäietto ch'o fa capî con ciû facilitâe e parolle de questo pöemetto, Savona, 1967.
- Guanciali e testoline (noterelle di un cappellano d'ospedale), Genova-Sampierdarena, Scuola Grafica Don Bosco, 1968.
- Peccou veniale: (lamenti, pentimenti e patimenti comme commenti e comme avvertimenti a vita spirituale di Conventi), con traduzione di Paolo Repetto; e disegni di Beppe Dellepiane, Genova, s.n., 1968.
- Il problema del rapporto fra l'Uomo e Dio in Jean-Paul Sartre e Gabriel Marcel, Sestri-Savona, s.n., 1968–1969.
- Bansighae da l'aexïa, Roma, Dell'Arco, 1970 (con Vito Elio Petrucci).
- L' angelo dei suburbi, Vico Equense, Isola d'oro, 1971.
- A foa do bestento..., Pisa, C. Cursi, 1971.
- l rapporto fra l'Uomo e Dio in Jean-Paul Sartre in Commentario Laurentianum, 12 (1971), Roma, 1971.
- Il rapporto fra Uomo e Dio in Gabriel Marcel in Commentario Laurentianum, 4 (1973), Roma, 1973.
- Diario di Lourdes, Vicenza, La Locusta, 1973. (con Primo Mazzolari).
- I crucci del critico, Genova, 1975.
- La Liguria cappuccina, Savona, 1975.
- Poesie: 1937–1970, Genova, 1975.
- Diario di un fraticello sacrestano: (agosto 1954-settembre 1955), i disegni sono del pittore Giacomo Linari, Sarzana, Carpena, 1976.
- Frate Jacopa in un epicedio serafico di Bruno Bruni in L'Italia Francescana, 52 (1977), Roma, 1977.
- Costituzioni d'Albacina e rilievi linguistico-stilistici in L'Italia Francescana, 53 (1978), Roma, 1978.
- Liguria cappuccina: poesie giocose, 1978.
- Vespertina oratio, Genova, 1979.

== Archives ==
Gherardo del Colle's archives consists of 65 archival units deposited at the Historical Archive of the Capuchins in Genoa. The documentation includes poems, critical essays on literature, manuscripts and drafts of articles intended for publication, literature handouts for the Study of Philosophy, plays, conference texts, articles published in newspapers and magazines, literary articles by various authors extracted from newspapers, incoming and outgoing correspondence with poets (Barile, Caproni, Quasimodo, and others), with publishers, literary critics, confreres and friends, and lastly a collection of sermons and notes for Spiritual Exercises.The archives contain also articles published in his memory after his death, photographs, an audio-cassette with a recording of a Mass, and a CD with transcriptions of works and articles dedicated to him. The collection is organized into the following series: "Studies, poems, articles, plays," "Correspondence" and "Sermons and spiritual exercises."

== Bibliography ==
- Barile, Angelo, Gherardo del Colle e Francesco De Nicola (a cura di), "Amor di Poesia" Lettere (1940–1966) (Genova: De Ferrari, 2010). ISBN 978-88-6405-156-7
- Bertagna, Mario, Gherardo Del Colle: una tempesta di sereno (Sant'Olcese: Dimes Genovese), 1981.
- Del Colle, Gherardo e Francesco De Nicola (a cura di), Il fresco presagio. Poesie 1937–77 (Genova: De Ferrari, 2008). ISBN 978-88-7172-967-1
- Trovato, Roberto, Gherardo del Colle, Scritti teatrali (Universita di Genova: Genova, 2013). ISBN 978-88-9775-223-3
- Conferenza su Gherardo del Colle con padre Agostino Bassani, padre Renzo Canozzi, padre Vittorio Casalino e la prof.ssa Maria Venturi tenuta al convento dei frati cappuccini di Genova Pontedecimo il 13 June 2024
