= Len Phillips (footballer, born 1891) =

Australian rules footballer

Personal information
- Full name: Percy Leonard Phillips
- Born: 29 March 1891; Berwick, Victoria
- Died: 21 March 1978 (aged 86); Parkville, Victoria
- Height: 185 cm (6 ft 1 in)
- Weight: 77 kg (170 lb)

Playing career^{1}
Years	Club	Games (Goals)
1913	Richmond	4 (2)
- ^{1} Playing statistics correct to the end of 1913.

Len Phillips (29 March 1891 – 21 March 1978) was an Australian rules footballer who played with Richmond in the Victorian Football League (VFL).
