= Luis Abraham Coreas =

Salvadoran footballer (1950-1978)

Personal information
- Full name: Luis Abraham Coreas Privado
- Date of birth: August 10, 1950
- Place of birth: Quelepa, San Miguel
- Date of death: 13 March 1978 (aged 27)
- Place of death: Moncagua, San Miguel, El Salvador
- Height: 1.82 m (6 ft 0 in)
- Position: Forward

Senior career*
Years	Team	Apps	(Gls)
1967–1968	Liberal		
1969–1974	Águila		
1974–1977	Luis Ángel Firpo		
1977-1978	Alianza		

International career
1971	El Salvador	3	(1)
- * Club domestic league appearances and goals

Luis Abraham Coreas Privado (10 August 1950 – 13 March 1978) was a Salvadoran footballer.

== Club career ==
Nicknamed el Muñeco, Luis Abraham played for the Juan Francisco Barraza-managed Águila, in which the big highlight came when on 20 November 1972, he scored the lone goal against Municipal Limeño to give Aguila their sixth national title. In 1974, Luis Abraham joined Luis Ángel Firpo and went on to play club football in Guatemala.

== Personal life ==
He is the brother of former footballers Víctor Coreas Privado, Salvador Coreas Privado, Marcos Coreas Privado and Carlos Coreas Privado.

He is also the father of former footballers Luis Abraham Coreas López (who played for Firpo, Santa Clara, Dragón, Liberal de Quelepa and Real Estelí (Nicaragua).
