= Richard Power (cricketer) =

Irish cricketer

Personal information
- Full name: Richard Wood Power
- Born: 2 February 1896; Dublin, Ireland
- Died: 3 March 1978 (aged 82); Fownhope, Herefordshire, England
- Batting: Right-handed

Domestic team information
- Years: Team
- 1920–1926: Ireland

Career statistics
| Competition | First-class |
|---|---|
| Matches | 4 |
| Runs scored | 78 |
| Batting average | 13.00 |
| 100s/50s | –/– |
| Top score | 30 |
| Catches/stumpings | 1/– |
- Source: Cricinfo, 7 November 2018

Richard Wood Power FRCSI (2 February 1896 – 3 March 1978) was an Irish first-class cricketer.

Power was born at Dublin in February 1896, and was educated in the city at Clongowes Wood College. He studied surgery at the Royal College of Surgeons in Ireland, graduating with an MB in 1920. He played his club cricket in Dublin for Dublin University Cricket Club and Phoenix, Power made his debut in first-class cricket for Ireland against Scotland at Edinburgh in 1920. He played in the same fixture the following season at Dublin. His next first-class appearance for Ireland came in 1925 on their tour of England and Wales, when he appeared against Wales at Llandudno. He toured England and Wales with Ireland the following year, making his final appearance in first-class cricket against Oxford University at Oxford. Across his four first-class matches, Power scored 78 runs at an average of 13.00, with a highest score of 30. He left Ireland shortly after to practice surgery in England. He was a Lieutenant in the Royal Army Medical Corps. He died at Fownhope in England in March 1978.
