= Juho Pyy =

Finnish smallholder and politician (1884–1978)

Johan (Juho) Pyy (19 October 1884 – 22 March 1978) was a Finnish smallholder and politician, born in Viipurin maalaiskunta. He was a member of the Parliament of Finland from 1930 to 1933 and from 1935 to 1951, representing the Social Democratic Party of Finland (SDP). He was a presidential elector in the 1931, 1937, 1940 and 1943 presidential elections. He was imprisoned in 1918 for having sided with the Reds during the Finnish Civil War.
