= Esther Scliar =

Brazilian pianist and composer (1926–1978)

- Born: 28 September 1926; Porto Alegre, Brazil
- Died: 18 March 1978 (aged 51)
- Occupations: Composer, educator
- Instrument: Piano

Esther Scliar (28 September 1926 – 18 March 1978) was a Brazilian pianist and composer.

== Biography ==
Esther Scliar was born in Porto Alegre, Rio Grande do Sul, Brazil to Isaac and Rosa Scliar. Esther spent the first years of her life in Rivera, Uruguay, but her parents separated and Scliar moved with her father to Passo Fundo where she and her sister were raised by their aunt, Jayme Scliar Kruter. Scliar took piano lessons in Passo Fundo with Eva Kruter Kotlhar and Judith Pacheco. After her father remarried, she moved with him to Porto Alegre where she graduated from the American College and from the Institute of Fine Arts in piano.

After graduating, she taught piano and continued studies in composition at the Institute of Fine Arts, and later in Rio de Janeiro with H.J. Koellreuter and in Venice with Hermann Scherchen. In 1950 she attempted suicide, and later became a militant affiliated with the Communist Youth of the Brazilian Communist Party.

Scliar worked as a pianist and taught harmony, music theory, analysis, and composition at the Instituto Villa-Lobos and Seminários de Música Pró-Arte. In 1952 she studied choral conducting with Nilda Müller in Montevideo and founded and was the first conductor of the Choir of the Musical Youth Association of Porto Alegre. In 1966 she wrote the music for the movie The Loss of Mario Fiorani and received an award for "Best Song" at the Brazilian Film Week II.

In 1952 she found she had contracted tuberculosis and in 1968 had a stroke, after which she left her position at Villa-Lobos Institute. Her father died in 1975, and she died by suicide at age 51 in 1978.

== Works ==
Scliar's compositions were often inspired by folk music. She composed about ninety works. Selected compositions include:

- 1950 Ao sair da Lua for chorus
- 1952 A pedrinha vai for chorus
- 1953 Vira a Moenda for chorus
- 1953 Dorme-Dorme for chorus
- 1953 Beira Mar
- 1953 Maracatu Elefante (after a melody by Capiba)
- 1953 Papagaio louro (text: Geny Marcondes)
- 1953 Flor da noite (text: Geny Marcondes)
- 1953 Acalanto (text: Geny Marcondes)
- 1953 Oração à manhã (text: Geny Marcondes)
- 1953 Por sete mares (text: Geny Marcondes)
- 1953 Bumba meu boi
- 1953 Uma, duas angolinhas
- 1953 Romeiro de São Francisco
- 1953 Si quizieras que cantemos
- 1953 La Virgen de las Mercedes
- 1953 Toada de Nanã
- 1953 No Parque for children's chorus
- 1954 A Esquila for voice and piano - poetry of Laci Osório
- 1954 Novos Cantares with poetry by García Lorca
- 1954 Modinha with poetry by Langston Hughes
- 1954 Modinha with poetry by Juan Ramón Jiménez
- 1954 Eu plantei a cana
- 1954 João Pestana
- 1954 Boiadeiro
- 1954 Duas Toadas for solo piano
- 1956 Eu Fui Chamado pra Cantar no Limoeiro on a folk theme, for 4 voices, string quintet and piano
- 1957 Cantiga do Cacau for chorus
- 1957 Abertura
- 1960 Sonata for flute and piano
- 1960 Orchestration of A Marcha dos Deputados (music by Geny Marcondes) to Revolução na América do Sul, a documentary by Augusto Boal
- 1961 Sonata for piano
- 1962 Musical direction of Quatro Séculos de Maus Costumes, directed by Paulo Afonso Grisolli
- 1962 O Menino Ruivo for mixed chorus a capella, with poetry by Reynaldo Jardim
- 1962 Desenho Leve for chorus, with poetry by Cecília Meireles.
- 1963 Score and musical direction of As famosas Asturianas de Augusto Boal
- 1964 Canto Menor com Final Heróico for chorus, text: Reynaldo Jardim
- 1965 Lua, Lua, Lua for chorus, text: Lucia Candall
- 1965 Pachamana for chorus
- 1965 Para Peneirar for chorus
- 1965 Entre o Ser e as Coisas for voice and piano with poetry by Carlos Drummond de Andrade
- 1966 Music for the film A Derrota by Mário Fiorani
- 1966 Movimento de Quarteto for quartet
- 1971 Busca da Identidade entre o Homem e o Rio for chorus with poetry by José Carlos Capinam.
- 1973 Sentimiento del Tempo for mixed chorus with poetry by Giuseppe Ungaretti
- 1974 Ofulú Lorerê ê (after a song of Oxalá) for chorus
- 1976 Imbricata for flute, oboe and piano
- 1976 Estudo nº 1 for guitar
- 1976 Praia do Fim do Mundo for chorus, with poetry by Cecília Meireles
- 1976 Toada de Gabinete for chorus
- 1977 Intermorfose
- 1978 Invenção a Duas Vozes for alto sax and piano

=== Books ===
- Fraseologia Musical (1982)
- Elementos de Teoria Musical (1985)
- Análise de Density 21, 5 de Varèse (1985)
- Solfejos Gradativos - Ed. Goldberg
