= Harald Mors =

WWII Luftwaffe officer (1910–2001)

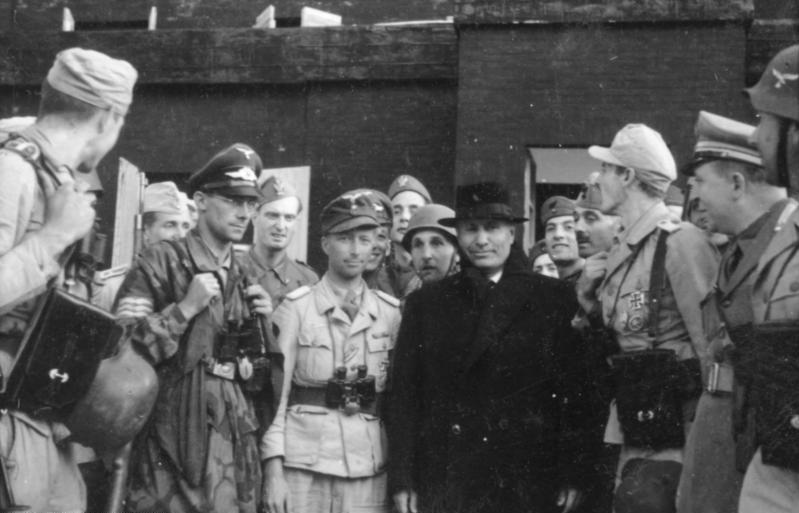
Harald-Otto Mors, to the right of Mussolini. Campo Imperatore, 12 September 1943

Harald-Otto Mors (18 November 1910 – 11 February 2001) was a German Luftwaffe officer (1934–1945) during the Second World War. In the summer of 1943 he commanded a battalion of Fallschirmjäger and planned and led the Gran Sasso raid to rescue Benito Mussolini following his arrest in September 1943. He received the German Cross in Gold on 26 September 1943. He became a Bundeswehr officer from 1955 until his retirement in 1965.

Mors played a key role in planning the raid, and participated as commander of the secondary force that secured the lower cable-car station at the foot of the Gran Sasso mountain as the airborne raid was underway at the mountain top, where Mussolini was held.
