= R. W. T. Lees-Jones =

Richard William Thomas Lees-Jones (11 May 1891 – 25 March 1978) was a British philatelist who signed the Roll of Distinguished Philatelists in 1950.

Lees-Jones was an expert on the stamps of Canada and plated the early issues, particularly the 12½c of 1859. In 1936 he gave to the Royal Philatelic Society London a collection of Canada 1897–1936 in mint blocks of four with plate numbers. In 1951 he won that society's Tilleard Medal for his display of Papermakers' Watermarks. That collection was auctioned by HR Harmer Ltd in 1952. His Canadian stamps were shown, hors concours, at the London International Stamp Exhibition 1960. He was President of the Canadian Philatelic Society.
