= Enrico Accorretti =

Italian admiral (1888–1978)

- Born: 14 July 1888; Macerata, Kingdom of Italy
- Died: 14 March 1978 (aged 89); Rome, Italy
- Military career
- Allegiance: Kingdom of Italy
- Branch: Regia Marina
- Service years: 1907–1947
- Rank: Ammiraglio di Squadra (Admiral)
- Commands: Red Sea Naval Command; Castelfidardo (destroyer); 2nd Destroyer Squadron; Emanuele Pessagno (destroyer); 5th Torpedo Boat Squadron; Zara (heavy cruiser); 9th Naval Division
- Conflicts: Italo-Turkish War; World War I; Adriatic Campaign; Second Italo-Ethiopian War; Spanish Civil War; Catalonia Offensive; World War II; Battle of Punta Stilo; Battle of Cape Spartivento; Operation Grog; Battle of Cape Matapan; First Battle of Sirte
- Awards: Silver Medal of Military Valor (three times); War Cross for Military Valor (twice); Military Order of Savoy; Military Order of Italy; War Merit Cross; Order of the Crown of Italy; Colonial Order of the Star of Italy

Enrico Accorretti (14 July 1888 – 14 March 1978) was an Italian admiral during World War II.

== Early life ==
He was born in Macerata on July 14, 1888, the son of Marquis Giuseppe Accorretti, lieutenant colonel in the cavalry of the Royal Italian Army, and of Bianca Malacari Misturi. After attending the first year at the Institute of Social Sciences of the University of Florence, he chose to pursue a military career like his father and brother Alberto.

== Military career ==
In 1907 he entered the Royal Naval Academy of Livorno, graduating in 1911 with the rank of ensign. He served on the armored cruiser Pisa during the Italo-Turkish War. After the Kingdom of Italy entered World War I on 24 May 1915, he first served as a navigation officer on the destroyer Ardito, engaged in the protection of naval traffic between Brindisi and La Spezia, and later on the protected cruiser Piemonte, operating within the Anglo-French squadron stationed in Thessaloniki. After returning to Italy in 1917 he became aide of Admiral Luigi Cito Filomarino in Venice, and later of the Duke of Spoleto and of the commander of the Third Army, Lieutenant General Emanuele Filiberto of Savoy-Aosta. He developed an interest in aviation and obtained the license of seaplane pilot, after which (having been meanwhile promoted to lieutenant) he was assigned to the "Giuseppe Miraglia" seaplane station in Venice as group leader of the bombing squadrons, participating in the bombing of Pola on 17 July 1918. Altogether he carried out twenty flight missions and was awarded a Silver Medal of Military Valour.

After the end of the Great War he embarked again on the Pisa, stationed in the Levant, and resumed his studies, obtaining a degree in social sciences in 1924. In 1920 he took part in a cruise to Brazil, Argentina and Uruguay on board the battleship Roma. In 1922 he assumed the superior naval command for the Red Sea and the Indian Ocean with the gunboat Misurata as flagship, participating in the studies on the first military operations aimed at reasserting Italian sovereignty over Somalia. In 1924 he was promoted to lieutenant commander and given command of the destroyer Castelfidardo, and in 1925–26 he became commander of the 2nd Destroyer Squadron. From 22 April 1927 to 11 September 1928, after promotion to commander, he was once again appointed commander of Italian naval forces in the Red Sea, as well as naval commander of Massawa, with the minelayer Legnano as flagship. In 1929 he was appointed Deputy Chief of Staff of Admiral Antonio Foschini, commander of the Special Naval Division.

In 1930 he married Miss Nerina Varvaro and attended the naval warfare school, at the end of which he returned to sea as commander of the destroyer Emanuele Pessagno and then of the 5th Torpedo Boat Squadron, with flag on Giuseppe Cesare Abba. He was then transferred to the office of the Chief of Staff of the Navy and in 1934 he was promoted to captain, taking command of the heavy cruiser Zara from 16 September 1934 to 14 August 1935. At the outbreak of the Second Italo-Ethiopian War he was once again sent to the Red Sea, where he helped with the logistics organization, and then took command of the torpedo boat group based in Massawa. He was part of the retinue of Princess Yolanda of Savoy when she made a visit to Eritrea and the Indian Ocean on the hospital ship Cesarea. In late 1938 he was sent to Spain as commander of the Italian naval mission, set up at the outbreak of the Spanish Civil War, which had the dual purpose of supporting the Corpo Truppe Volontarie and acting as a liaison with the Nationalist Navy of Generalissimo Francisco Franco. He fought personally in the battle of Catalonia, and was among the first to enter Barcelona in January 1939, earning another Silver Medal of Military Valor. As the war was ending in favor of the Nationalists, he performed diplomatic tasks by forging ties between the two countries, and after the war he was promoted to rear admiral and became naval attaché at the Italian Embassy in Madrid.

== World War II ==
On 10 June 1940, when Italy entered the Second World War, he became Chief of Staff first of Admiral Riccardo Paladini, and then of Admiral Angelo Iachino, commanders of the 2nd Fleet. He participated in the battle of Punta Stilo and then in operations that saw the Italian fleet opposing the movements of the Mediterranean Fleet from 31 August to 1 September 1940, without meeting the enemy in battle. At the end of November he participated in the battle of Cape Spartivento. In December 1940, when the First and Second Fleet were merged into a unified battlefleet, under the command of Admiral Iachino, Accorretti assumed the position of Chief of Staff of the newly established Naval Battle Forces (F.N.B.). In this new position he collaborated with Iachino in the reorganization and transfer of personnel for the establishment of a unified command and participated in the main naval operations of 1941, such as the fruitless chase for the British squadron that had bombarded Genoa in February, and the battle of Cape Matapan in March (along with Iachino, he was one of the only two officers informed of the operation, and participated in its planning and preparation). In December he participated in the First Battle of Sirte, and after promotion to vice admiral in 1942 he took over the operations department at Supermarina. In April 1943 he returned to sea, taking command of the 9th Division, formed by the battleships Vittorio Veneto (flagship), Littorio and Roma.

On the evening of 8 September 1943, after the proclamation of the Armistice of Cassibile, he was ordered to set sail for La Maddalena, after having disembarked all German personnel. When the crews learned that the fleet would sail to Malta and surrender to the Allies, Accorretti personally intervened with the officers and crews, inviting them to maintain discipline. On 9 September the fleet was attacked by the Luftwaffe, which sank Roma and damaged Italia (ex-Littorio), and after the death of Admiral Carlo Bergamini Admiral Romeo Oliva took command and sailed the fleet to Malta. From there, the two surviving battleships of the 9th Division were transferred to Alexandria and then to the Great Bitter Lake, where they were interned with reduced crews. During this period Accorretti worked relentlessly to keep up the morale of his men, who were forced into inaction, prohibited from going ashore, and short of supplies. After returning to Italy in the spring of 1944, he was wounded in Taranto owing to an explosion. In 1945 he was promoted to full admiral and assumed the post of Deputy Chief of Staff of the Navy, organizing the demining of national waters and the repatriation of Italian prisoners from Africa and the Middle East.

== Later life ==
A staunch monarchist, Accorretti retired from the Navy in February 1947, following the establishment of the Italian Republic. In 1963 he ran at the elections for the Chamber of Deputies with the Italian Democratic Party of Monarchist Unity, but was not elected. He died in Rome on 14 March 1978.
