= Kaarle Sorkio =

Finnish businessman and politician (1910–1978)

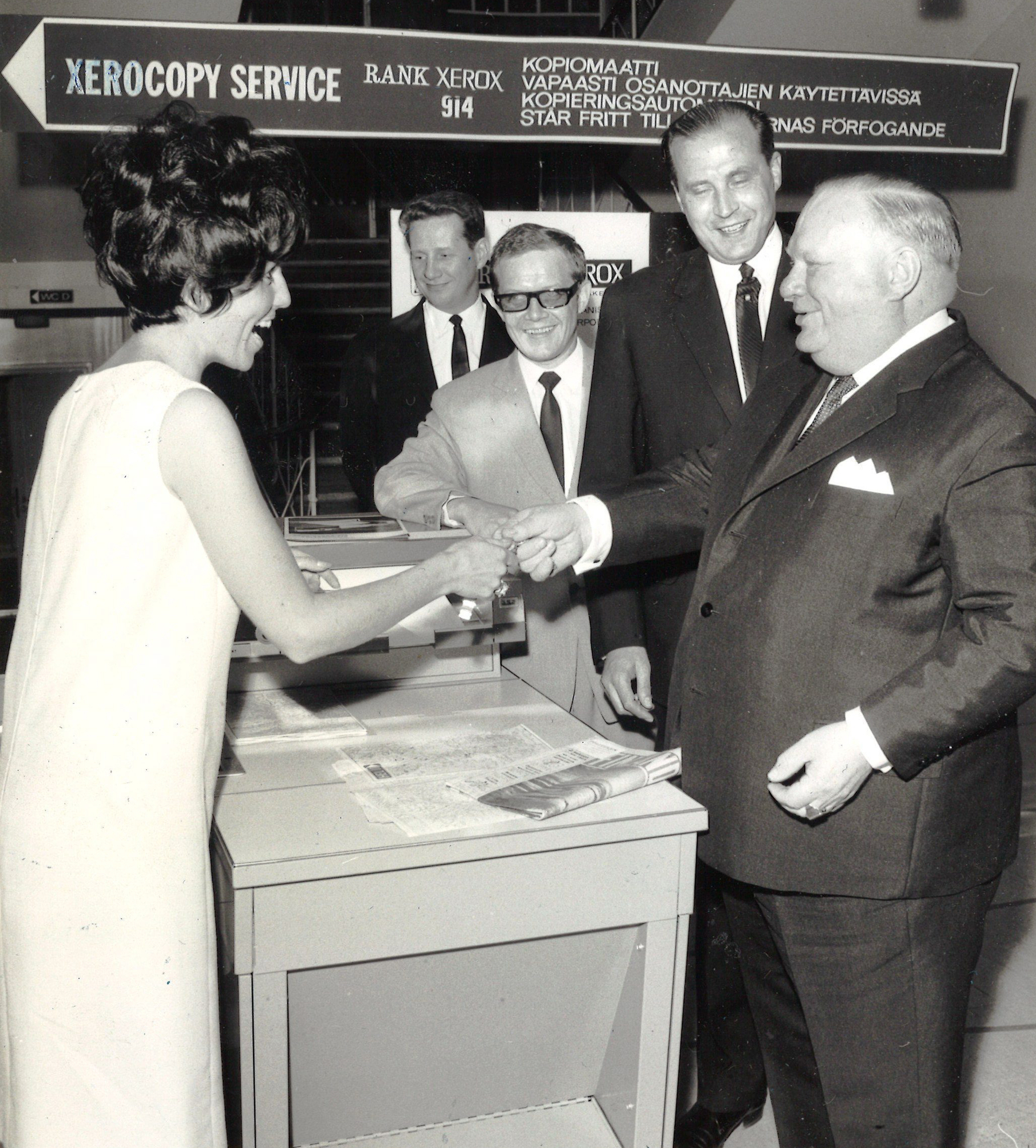
Kaarle Sorkio (right) in 1965

Kaarle Vihtori Sorkio (11 November 1910 – 29 March 1978; surname until 1931 Sorkenius) was a Finnish business executive and politician, born in Alastaro. He was a member of the People's Party of Finland. When the People's Party of Finland merged into the Liberal People's Party (LKP) in 1965, Sorkio became a member of that party. He served as Deputy Minister of Social Affairs from 12 September 1964 to 27 May 1965.
