= Jim Donnelly (cricketer) =

Australian cricketer

Personal information
- Full name: James Louis Donnelly
- Born: 24 June 1906; Merimbula, Australia
- Died: 2 March 1978 (aged 71); Koorawatha, New South Wales, Australia
- Source: ESPNcricinfo, 26 December 2016

Jim Donnelly (24 June 1906 – 2 March 1978) was an Australian cricketer. He played three first-class matches for New South Wales between 1929/30 and 1931/32.

== See also ==
- List of New South Wales representative cricketers
