= Frank Raymond =

Australian rules footballer, born 1903

Personal information
- Full name: Eugene Francis Raymond
- Born: 21 August 1903; Brunswick, Victoria
- Died: 6 March 1978 (aged 74); Dandenong, Victoria
- Height: 177 cm (5 ft 10 in)
- Weight: 70 kg (154 lb)

Playing career^{1}
Years	Club	Games (Goals)
1930	Fitzroy	1 (0)
- ^{1} Playing statistics correct to the end of 1930.

Frank Raymond (21 August 1903 – 6 March 1978) was an Australian rules footballer who played with Fitzroy in the Victorian Football League (VFL).

Raymond later served in the Australian Army during World War II.
