= Jean Kellogg =

American author and academic

Dr. Jean Kellogg (née Jean Mathieson DeFrees, sometimes also Jean Defrees Kellogg); December 28, 1916 Chicago, Illinois – March 12, 1978) was an American author and academic of various genres.

== Biography ==
Kellogg married manufacturer James Hull Kellogg (1912–1967) in 1939, after receiving her B.A. with highest honors from Smith College, with a thesis on writer Henry Blake Fuller. She spent the next several years completing her Masters and Doctoral Studies at the University of Chicago. She became an editor at the Henry Regnery Co. in Chicago from (1950–1964), and then, after finishing her dissertation in 1969 on the Catholic Novel in a Period of Convergence, a professor of English and Literature at Mundelein College and Rosary College. In the early 1960s, she adapted several of L. Frank Baum's Oz books for juveniles, including several adaptations for which she was uncredited. She wrote several of her own books under the pseudonyms Sally Jackson (children's books) and Gene Kellogg (academic papers).

== Works ==
=== Published by Loyola University Press, under the pseudonym Gene Kellogg ===
- The vital tradition; the Catholic novel in a period of convergence (1970)
- Dark prophets of hope—Dostoevsky, Sartre, Camus, Faulkner (1975)

=== Original works published by Reilly & Lee under the name Jean Kellogg (or Jean Defrees Kellogg) ===
- The rod and the rose (1964) (Set during the second Punic War, follows General Hannibal's fictional young son, Hamilcar, and his friends on a dangerous trip from Carthage to Rome)
- Hans and the winged horse (1964)

=== Credited adaptations of Oz books ===
- Wizard of Oz by L. Frank Baum (1961)
- Ozma of Oz by L. Frank Baum (1961)
- Dorothy and the Wizard in Oz by L. Frank Baum (1961)
- The land of Oz by L. Frank Baum (1961)

=== Original children's books published by Reilly & Lee under the pseudonym Sally Jackson ===
- The Littlest Star; a story about ballet (1960)
- The Littlest Skater; the story of Jimmy One-Skate (1961)
- Here we go (1961)
- Is this your dog? (1962)
