= Natale Zaninetti =

Italian cyclist

Personal information
- Born: 24 March 1907
- Died: 10 March 1978 (aged 70)

Cycling career
- Sport: Cycling
- Discipline: Road
- Role: Rider

Natale Zaninetti (24 March 1907 – 10 March 1978) was an Italian racing cyclist. He rode in the 1928 Tour de France.
