= Wal Jenkins =

Australian rules footballer

Personal information
- Full name: Walter Owen Jenkins
- Born: 9 January 1897; Port Melbourne, Victoria
- Died: 19 March 1978 (aged 81); South Melbourne, Victoria

Playing career^{1}
Years	Club	Games (Goals)
1917	South Melbourne	2 (0)
- ^{1} Playing statistics correct to the end of 1917.

Walter Owen Jenkins (9 January 1897 – 19 March 1978) was an Australian rules footballer who played with South Melbourne in the Victorian Football League (VFL).
