= Rua Van Horn =

American educator

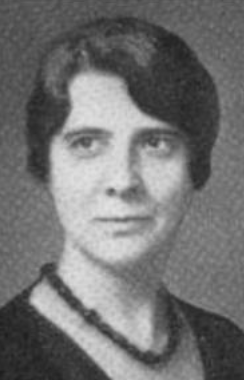
- Rua Van Horn, from a 1935 publication of the US Department of the Interior
- Born: July 17, 1892; North Loup, Nebraska
- Died: March 8, 1978 (aged 85); Alexandria, Virginia
- Occupations: Educator, home economist, federal official

Rua Van Horn (July 17, 1892 – March 8, 1978) was an American educator and home economist with the United States Office of Education from 1934 to 1963.

== Early life and education ==
Rua Rae Van Horn was born on her family's ranch in North Loup, Nebraska, the daughter of Orel Van Horn and Carrie Elnora Babcock Van Horn. She graduated from high school in 1911, then from the Lewis Institute in Chicago, and earned a master's degree from Teachers College, Columbia University.

== Career ==
Van Horn taught school for ten years as a young woman, and was Montana state supervisor of home economics while she was teaching at Montana State University. She also taught in Oakland, California, and in a summer program at Colorado State College. She joined the United States Office of Education as a program specialist in home economics education in 1934.

In 1938, Van Horn testified before a House hearing on funding for federal funding for home economics programs. She served on the Future Homemakers of America advisory board for its first seven years. From 1948 to 1949, she was president of the D.C. Home Economics Association. In 1951, she was honored by the Nevada Home Economics Association. In 1949, she attended the Seventh International Congress on Home Economics, held in Stockholm. In 1953, she attended the Eighth International Congress on Home Economics, held in Edinburgh. In 1958, she resigned from the Office of Education to serve as chief advisor on a Ford Foundation and Oklahoma State University project to develop college curricula for home economics for schools and universities in Pakistan. She returned to the Office of Education from 1961 to 1963, as a specialist in women's employment and vocational training. In 1965, she consulted with the University of Nebraska's school of home economics.

== Publications ==
- Homemaking Education Program for Adults (1938, with Mary Stuart Lyle)
- The teaching of certain aspects of child development in the homemaking program in the secondary school: a compilation of materials from states (1938, compiler)
- The teaching of certain aspects of child development in the homemaking program in the secondary school: a compilation of materials from states (1939, compiler)
- Household Employment Problems: A Handbook for Round-table Discussions Among Household Employers (1939)

== Personal life ==
Van Horn was active in Seventh Day Baptist activities in Chicago. In 1920, she was president of the Christian Endeavor class at the Chicago Seventh Day Baptist Sabbath School. In 1922, Van Horn was a delegate to the Seventh Day Baptist General Conference. Rua Van Horn was listed as "partner" of her colleague Lucille Reynolds in the 1940 United States census; they lived together in Washington, D.C. She died in 1978, aged 85 years, at her home in Alexandria, Virginia.
