= John Lawes (company director) =

John Frederick Renshaw Lawes (3 May 1907 – 5 March 1978) was an Australian company director and chairman of QBE Insurance.

== Early life ==
Lawes was born in Petersham, New South Wales. His father, Dr Charles Lawes, was a medical graduate of the University of Sydney and John was one of four brothers with one sister. He, his brothers, and before them their father, all had their school education at Newington College (1919–1926).

== Cricket ==
Lawes was one of Sydney's longest playing first grade cricketers.

== Business career ==
Lawes was the founding chairman of QBE Insurance (1973–1978) and served as chairman of Fibre Containers and London Australia Investment. He was deputy chairman – Allied Manufacturing and Trading Industries and of British Tobacco (Australia), where he worked for forty-six years.
