= Jack Millen =

Australian rules footballer (1900–1978)

Personal information
- Full name: Jack Millen
- Born: 25 July 1900; Carlton North, Victoria
- Died: 9 March 1978 (aged 77); Kew, Victoria
- Height: 173 cm (5 ft 8 in)
- Weight: 80 kg (176 lb)
- Position: Rover

Playing career^{1}
Years	Club	Games (Goals)
1925–1928, 1930	Fitzroy	61 (42)
- ^{1} Playing statistics correct to the end of 1930.

Jack Millen (25 July 1900 – 9 March 1978) was a former Australian rules footballer who played with Fitzroy in the Victorian Football League (VFL).
