= Summary execution =

Execution without trial

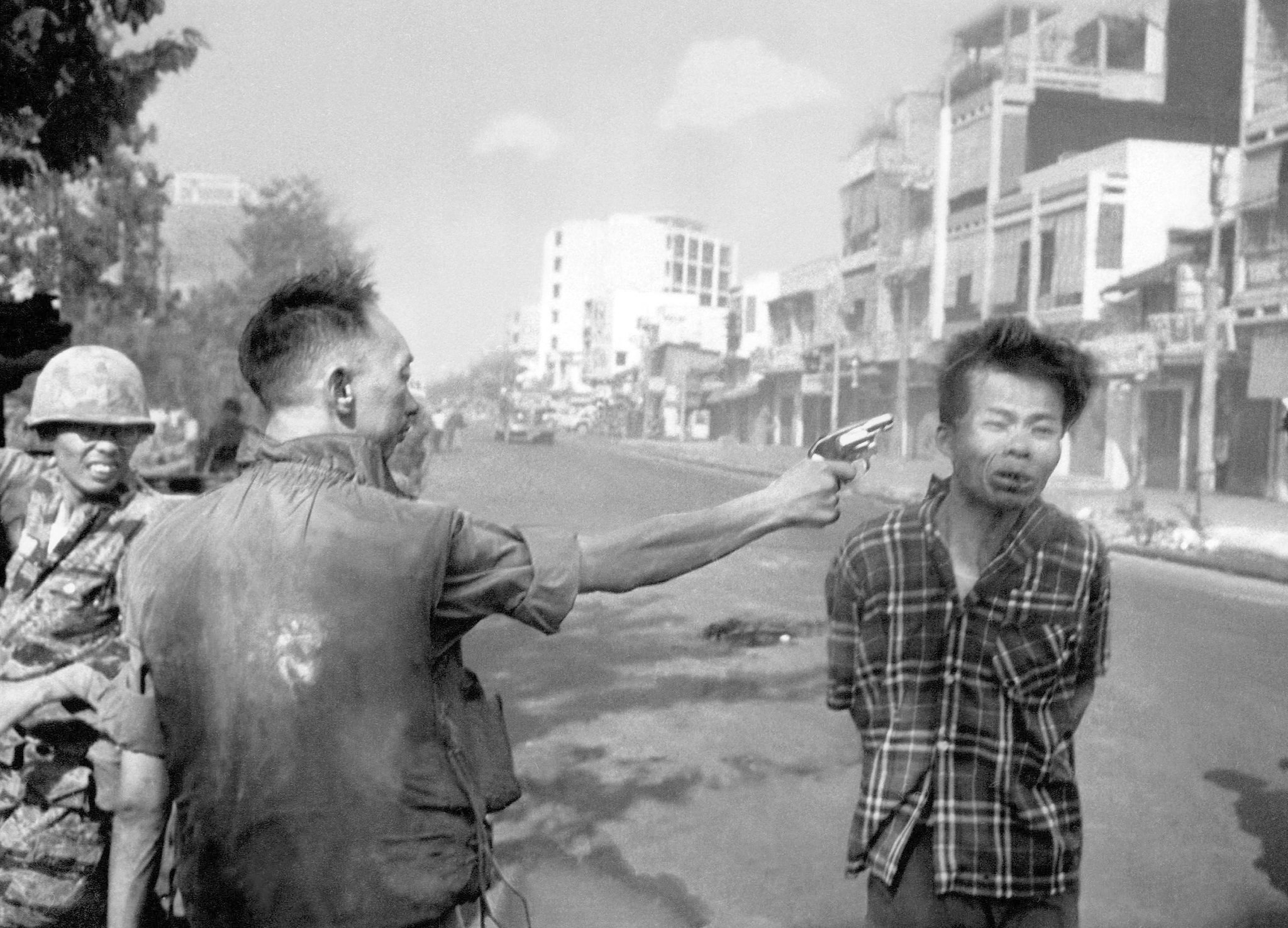
Nguyễn Ngọc Loan summarily executes Viet Cong Captain Lê Công Nà in Saigon during the Tet Offensive in 1968.

In civil and military jurisprudence, summary execution (also called field execution) is the putting to death of a person accused of a crime without the benefit of a free and fair trial. The term results from the legal concept of summary justice to punish a summary offense, as in the case of a drumhead court-martial, but the term usually denotes the summary execution of a sentence of death. Under international law, it is defined as a combatant's refusal to accept an opponent's lawful surrender and the combatant's provision of no quarter, by killing the surrendering opponents.

Summary executions have been practiced by governments and paramilitary organizations during both peacetime and war, and are usually associated with war crimes and political persecution.

== Military jurisdiction ==
This painting, The Third of May 1808 by Francisco Goya, depicts the summary execution of Spaniards by French forces after the Dos de Mayo Uprising in Madrid.

=== Prisoners of war ===
Major treaties such as the Geneva Conventions and Hague Conventions, and customary international law protect the rights of captured regular or irregular enemy soldiers and civilians. Prisoners-of-war (POWs) must be treated in carefully defined ways which definitively ban summary execution, as the Second Additional Protocol of the Geneva Conventions (1977) states:

No sentence shall be passed and no penalty shall be executed on a person found guilty of an offence except pursuant to a conviction pronounced by a court offering the essential guarantees of independence and impartiality.

— Second Protocol of the Geneva Conventions (1977), Article 6.2

=== Exceptions to prisoners-of-war status ===
However, some classes of combatants may not be accorded POW status, but that definition has broadened to cover more classes of combatants over time. In the past, summary execution of pirates, spies, and francs-tireurs have been performed and considered legal under existing international law. Francs-tireurs (a term originating in the Franco-Prussian War) are enemy civilians or militia who continue to fight in territory occupied by a warring party and do not wear military uniforms, and may otherwise be known as guerrillas, partisans, insurgents, etc. Though they could be legally jailed or executed by most armies a century ago, the experience of World War II influenced nations occupied by foreign forces to change the law to protect this group. Many of the post-war victors, such as France, Poland, and the USSR, had the experience of resistance fighters being summarily executed by the Axis if they were captured. The war also influenced them to make sure that commandos and other special forces who were caught deep behind enemy lines would be protected as POWs, rather than summarily executed as Hitler decreed through his 1942 Commando Order.

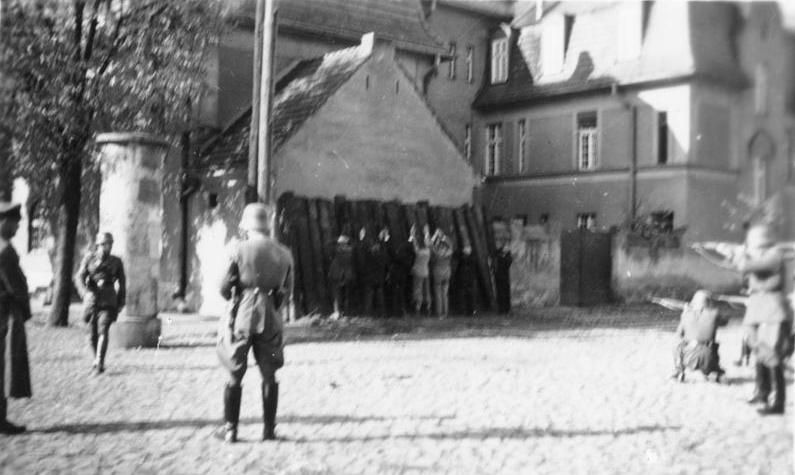
Polish people being executed by a German firing squad in Kórnik, October 1939

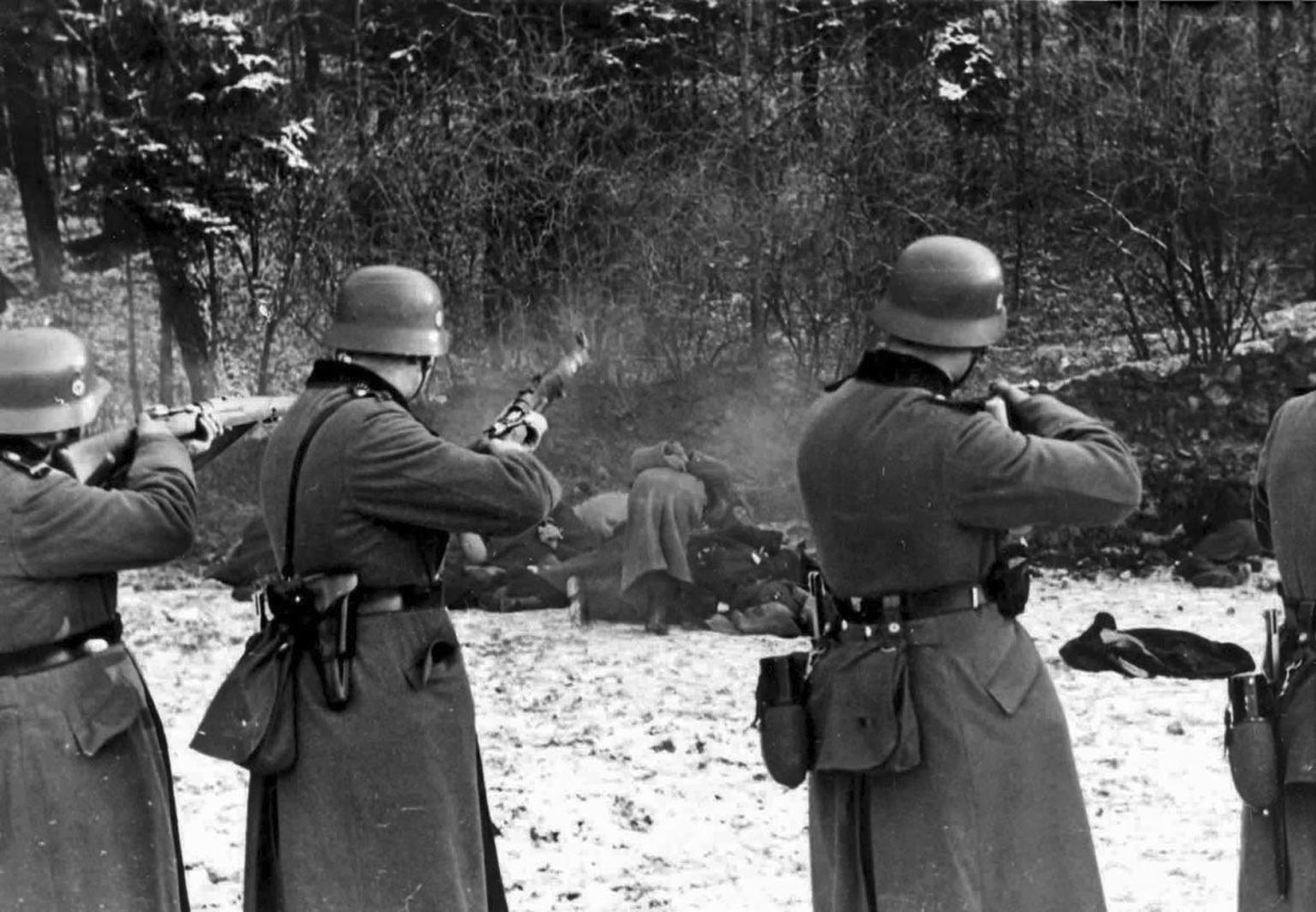
The execution of 56 Polish citizens in Bochnia, near Kraków, during German occupation of Poland, December 18, 1939, in a reprisal for an attack on a German police office two days earlier by the underground organization "White Eagle"

The Commando Order was issued by Adolf Hitler on October 18, 1942, stating that all Allied commandos encountered by German forces in Europe and Africa should be killed immediately without trial, even in proper uniforms or if they attempted to surrender. Any commando or small group of commandos or a similar unit, agents and saboteurs not in proper uniforms who fell into the hands of the German military forces by some means other than direct combat (through the police in occupied territories, for instance) were to be handed over immediately to the Sicherheitsdienst (Security Service). The order, which was issued in secret, made it clear that failure to carry out such orders by any commander or officer would be considered to be an act of negligence punishable under German military law. This was in fact the second "Commando Order", the first being issued by Generalfeldmarschall Gerd von Rundstedt on July 21, 1942, stipulating that parachutists should be handed over to the Gestapo. Shortly after World War II, at the Nuremberg Trials, the Commando Order was found to be a direct breach of the laws of war, and German officers who carried out illegal executions under the Commando Order were found guilty of war crimes.

Soldiers who are wearing uniforms of the opposing army after the start of combat may be considered illegal combatants and subject to summary execution. Many armies have performed that kind of false flag ruse, including both German and US special forces during World War II. However, if soldiers remove their disguises and put on proper insignia before the start of combat in such an operation, they are legal combatants and must be treated as prisoners of war (POWs) if captured. That distinction was settled by a military tribunal in the postwar trial of Otto Skorzeny, who led Operation Greif, an infiltration mission in which German commandos wore US uniforms to infiltrate US lines during the Battle of the Bulge.

== See also ==
- Outline of capital punishment
- Arbitrary arrest and detention
- Encounter killings by police
- Extrajudicial punishment
- Extrajudicial killing
- Forced disappearance
- Genocide justification
- Lynching
- Murder
- Retributive justice
- Targeted killing
- Social cleansing
