= Operation François =

1943 Nazi sabotage attempt in Iran

Operation François was an attempt made by the German Army's Abwehr to use the dissident Qashqai people in Iran to sabotage British and American supplies bound for the Soviet Union.

Operation François was led by Otto Skorzeny, who sent a handful of men from the 502nd SS Jäger Battalion to parachute into Iran during the summer of 1943, the first mission carried out by the unit. Skorzeny, who remained behind to train more recruits, characterized Operation François as "a failure" due mainly to inadequate reinforcements and supplies needed for the mission.

Michael Bar-Zohar, in his biography of Paul Ernst Fackenheim, states that during Fackenheim's captivity in Latrun, where the British also kept Nazi-sympathizer General Fazlollah Zahedi, he saw "six or seven SS prisoners who parachuted into southern Iran, loaded with explosives and gold, and tried to bribe the Qashqai into rebelling against the British ... once they ran out of gold, the Qashqai turned them to the British."
