= Stanko Nick =

Croatian diplomat (1935–2010)

- Born: 31 August 1935; Zagreb, Kingdom of Yugoslavia
- Died: 24 April 2010 (aged 74); Zagreb, Croatia
- Relatives: Alfred Nick (father); Jelisava Nick (mother); Natko Nick (brother)

Stanko Nick (31 August 1935 – 24 April 2010) was a Croatian university professor and ambassador.

== Life ==
Stanko Nick was born in Zagreb to parents Alfred and Jelisava in a family of intellectuals. His father Alfred was a doctor, mother Jelisava was a pharmacist, and his grandfather was a judge in Kraków during the time of Austria-Hungary. After World War II broke out, Nick's father was forced to leave Zagreb and go to Visoko. With the help of local Franciscans he managed to join the partisans. His older brother Natko was a member of Tito Escort Battalion and was killed during the Raid on Drvar. Stanko Nick survived the war, and his oral testimony was recorded by the USC Shoah Foundation Institute.

After the war he continued his education at a gymnasium in Zagreb, graduated at the Faculty of Law, obtained his PhD, and found a job at the Ministry of Foreign Affairs in Belgrade. He became the first dean of Dag Hammarskjöld University College of International Relations and Diplomacy. He worked in France, Australia and the United States. Since 1992 he was working at the Croatian Ministry of Foreign Affairs and since 2000 he was the foreign affairs advisor to Croatian president Stjepan Mesić. He wrote many articles and several books. Stanko Nick died in a hospital in Zagreb in 2010.
