= 502nd SS Jäger Battalion =

German special forces unit during WW2

SS-Jäger-Bataillon 502 (502nd SS Light Infantry Battalion) was a special forces unit of Nazi Germany's SS from 1943-1944.

Formed in June 1943, the unit was commanded by Otto Skorzeny and was based at Schloß (chateau) Friedenthal just north of Berlin in Sachsenhausen by Oranienburg, consisting originally of the three hundred members of the former (Provisional Special Unit Friedenthal) SS-Sonderverband z.b.V. Friedenthal (this was their official name until April 1944, then it was SS-Jäger-Bataillon 502 ) and Sonderlehrgang z.b.V. Oranienburg. After an unsuccessful attempt to train members of an SS penal facility, Skorzeny obtained permission to recruit volunteers from the Wehrmacht, and 100 SS personnel, 50 Luftwaffe and 150 Army personnel were admitted, allowing the formation of a headquarters company and two line companies. An intensive training programme was instituted.

Operation François was led by Otto Skorzeny, who sent the 502nd SS Jäger Battalion to parachute into Iran during the summer of 1943, the first mission carried out by the unit. Skorzeny, who remained behind to train more recruits, characterized Operation François as "a failure" due mainly to inadequate reinforcements and supplies needed for the mission.

In September 1943, sixteen members of this unit took part in the Gran Sasso raid, which resulted in the rescue of deposed Italian dictator Benito Mussolini.

They were later placed on standby for several operations that never took place, including a proposed kidnapping of Philippe Pétain.

In February 1944, a third company was formed from mainly Flemish and Dutch personnel with Hauptsturmführer Hoyer as its commanding officer. In the same month, No. 1 and 2 companies of the battalion went to the Kurmark troop training area for four weeks intensive training, after which they saw combat on the Eastern Front for over a month.

On 20 July 1944, No. 1 Company was deployed in Berlin, briefly occupying the Bendlerblock after the attempted assassination of Adolf Hitler.

In August 1944, fifty members of the unit carried out Operation Landfried in Romania, destroying road and railway bridges in an attempt to delay the Soviet advance. This mission was commanded by Walter Girg.

In September 1944, SS-Jäger-Bataillon 502 was dissolved and its personnel absorbed into a new battalion, SS-Jagdverband Mitte.

== Development ==
- Sonderlehrgang z.b.V. „Oranienburg“ (18 April 1943 – 16 June 1943)
- Sonderverband z. b. V. „Friedenthal“ (16 June 1943 – 17 April 1944)
- SS-Jäger-Bataillon 502 (17 April 1944 – 10 November 1944)
- SS-Jagdverband „Mitte“ (10 November 1944 – 8 May 1945)
  - 150. SS-Panzer-Brigade (November 1944 - 25–28 December 1944)
  - Division Schwedt Kampfgruppe/Sperrverband Skorzeny (31 January 1945 – 3 March 1945)
