= Fackenheim =

Fackenheim is a surname. Notable people with the surname include:

- Emil Fackenheim (1916–2003), German philosopher and rabbi
- Paul Ernst Fackenheim (born 1892), German army officer
