= Sonder Lehrgang Oranienburg =

German special forces unit during WW2

Sonderlehrgang z.b.V. "Oranienburg" (Special training course for special assignments "Oranienburg") was a commando and special forces unit of Nazi Germany's SS. It was assembled in early 1942 on the order of SS-Obergruppenführer Hans Jüttner as a rival to the Heer's Brandenburg Regiment.

Originally based at Oranienburg in Brandenburg, the unit consisted of 100 experienced volunteers from the Waffen-SS under the command of SS-Hauptsturmführer Pieter van Vessem.

Their first operational mission (Operation Osprey) was a proposed deployment to Ireland but this never transpired. In early 1943, five members of the unit were parachuted into Iran to assist guerrilla opposition to the Allied occupation.

Early in the summer of 1943, SS Sonderlehrgang Oranienburg moved to a purpose-built facility in nearby Friedenthal and was re-designated SS Sonderlehrgang zbV Friedenthal - the ‘zbV’ in the unit’s title stood for "zur besonderen Verwendung", i.e. it indicated special duties. At this time, the unit consisted of one full company under the command of SS-Hauptsturmführer van Vessem, as well as part of another company and a transport element. Comprising a total of 300 men, all personnel were members of the Waffen-SS, which included fifty Dutchmen and Flemings, with a few ethnic Germans from Hungary.

Shortly after this, the unit came under the command of Otto Skorzeny and was absorbed into SS-Sonderverband z.b.V. Friedenthal in June 1943. In October/November the unit was renamed 502nd SS Jäger Battalion.

== Development ==
- Sonderlehrgang z. b. V. „Oranienburg“ (18 April 1943 – 16 June 1943)
- Sonderverband z. b. V. "Friedenthal" (16 June 1943 – 17 April 1944)
- SS-Jäger-Bataillon 502 (17 April 1944 – 10 November 1944)
- SS-Jagdverband Mitte (10 November 1944 – 8 Mai 1945)
  - 150. SS-Panzer-Brigade (November 1944 - 25-28 December 1944)
  - Division Schwedt Kampfgruppe/Sperrverband Skorzeny (31 January 1945 – 3 March 1945)
