= Perfidy =

War crime involving breaking of a promise

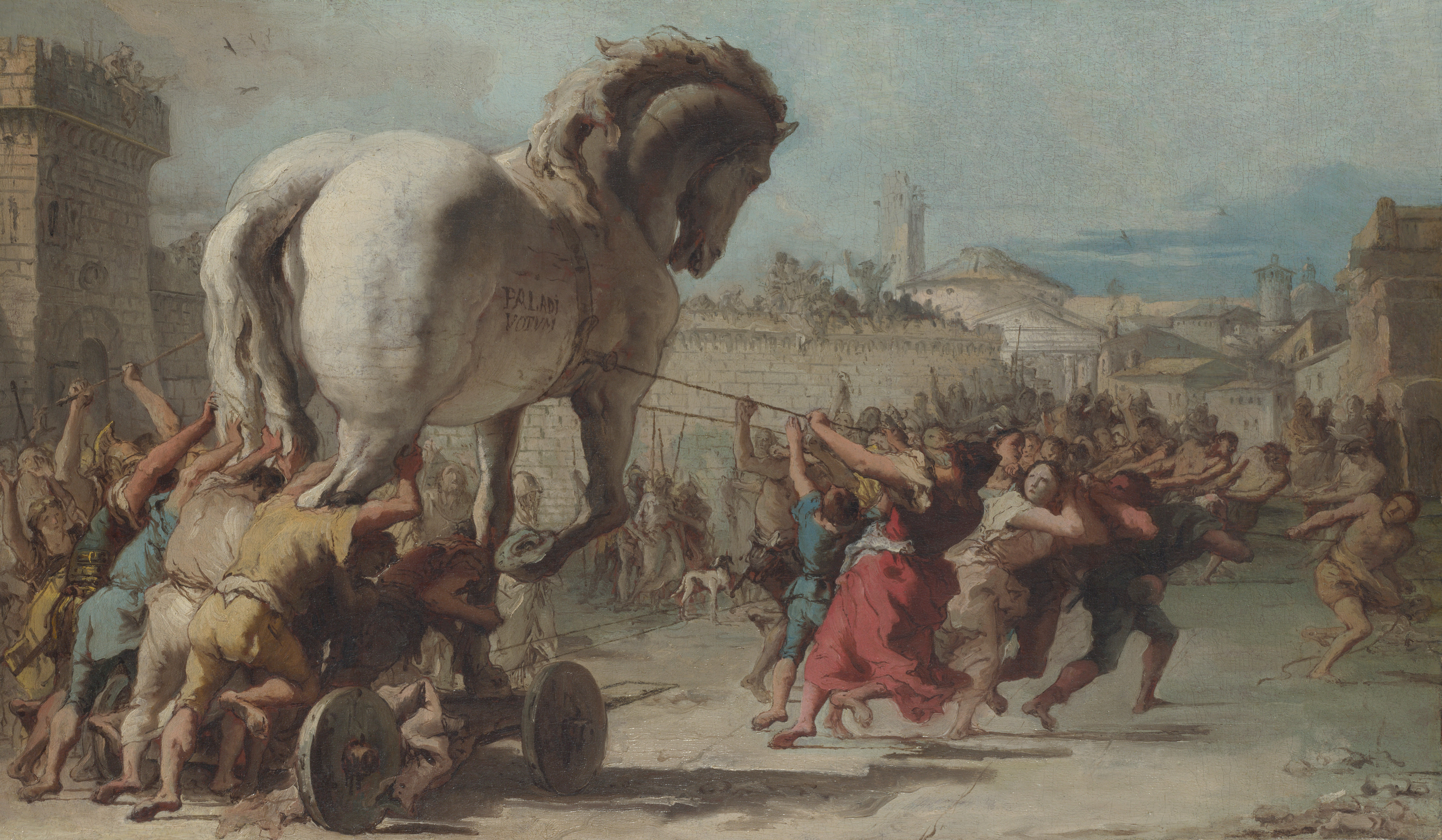
The use of the Trojan Horse by the Greeks in the Trojan War has been described by modern sources as an ancient example of perfidy.

In the context of war, perfidy is a form of deceptive tactic where one side pretends to act in good faith, such as signaling a truce (e.g., raising a white flag), but does so with the deliberate intention of breaking that promise. The goal is to trick the enemy into lowering its guard, such as stepping out of cover to accept a supposed surrender, only to exploit its vulnerability.

Perfidy constitutes a breach of the laws of war as it degrades the protections and mutual restraints developed in the interest of all parties, combatants and civilians.

== Geneva Conventions ==
Perfidy is specifically prohibited under the 1977 Protocol I Additional to the Geneva Conventions of 12 August 1949, which states:

Article 37. – Prohibition of perfidy

1. It is prohibited to kill, injure or capture an adversary by resort to perfidy. Acts inviting the confidence of an adversary to lead him to believe that he is entitled to, or is obliged to accord, protection under the rules of international law applicable in armed conflict, with intent to betray that confidence, shall constitute perfidy. The following acts are examples of perfidy:
  1. The feigning of an intent to negotiate under a flag of truce or of a surrender;
  2. The feigning of an incapacitation by wounds or sickness;
  3. The feigning of civilian, non-combatant status; and
  4. The feigning of protected status by the use of signs, emblems or uniforms of the United Nations or of neutral or other States not Parties to the conflict.
2. Ruses of war are not prohibited. Such ruses are acts that are intended to mislead an adversary or to induce him to act recklessly but which infringe no rule of international law applicable in armed conflict and which are not perfidious because they do not invite the confidence of an adversary with respect to protection under that law. The following are examples of such ruses: the use of camouflage, decoys, mock operations and misinformation.

Article 38. – Recognized emblems

1. It is prohibited to make improper use of the distinctive emblem of the red cross, red crescent or red lion and sun or of other emblems, signs or signals provided for by the Conventions or by this Protocol. It is also prohibited to misuse deliberately in an armed conflict other internationally recognized protective emblems, signs or signals, including the flag of truce, and the protective emblem of cultural property.
2. It is prohibited to make use of the distinctive emblem of the United Nations, except as authorized by that Organization.

Article 39. – Emblems of nationality

1. It is prohibited to make use in an armed conflict of the flags or military emblems, insignia or uniforms of neutral or other States not Parties to the conflict.
2. It is prohibited to make use of the flags or military emblems, insignia or uniforms of adverse Parties while engaging in attacks or to shield, favour, protect or impede military operations.
3. Nothing in this Article or in Article 37, paragraph 1(d), shall affect the existing generally recognized rules of international law applicable to espionage or to the use of flags in the conduct of armed conflict at sea.

== History ==
Disapproval of perfidy was part of the customary laws of war long before the prohibition of perfidy was included in Protocol I. For example, in the 1907 Hague Convention IV – The Laws and Customs of War on Land, Article 23 includes:

In addition to the prohibitions provided by special Conventions, it is especially forbidden ... (b) To kill or wound treacherously individuals belonging to the hostile nation or army; ... (f) To make improper use of a flag of truce, of the national flag, or of the military insignia and military uniform of the enemy, as well as the distinctive badges of the Geneva Convention; ...

The Kilmichael Ambush (1921), part of the Irish War of Independence, was the scene of a notorious act of alleged perfidy. 36 members of the Irish Republican Army ambushed a truck carrying 18 Auxiliary Division officers. IRA leader Tom Barry claimed in his memoirs, Guerrilla Days in Ireland, that some of the Auxiliaries shouted, "We surrender, we surrender", and that when IRA men stood up from their positions, they were fired upon by other Auxiliaries. This led Barry to disbelieve the Auxiliaries when, later in the battle, they attempted to surrender: all 18 were shot and left for dead. One Auxiliary escaped but was later captured and killed; another, Frederick Henry Forde, survived with severe injuries and was rescued by British forces. Some historians have claimed that Barry invented the story of the false surrender to justify the killing of the entire unit.

During the Pacific War, the Imperial Japanese Armed Forces were reported to often disguise their installations and transportation with protective signs such as the red cross, booby-trap their dead and wounded, and fake surrenders or injuries to lure Allied troops into a trap and then surprise-attack them. One example of supposed perfidy was the "Goettge Patrol" during the early days of the Guadalcanal Campaign in 1942. Confusion regarding a possible surrender of Japanese troops came about due to a sighting of what the Americans believed to be a "white flag" along with faulty intelligence from a captured, drunken Japanese officer. This resulted in more than 20 US combat deaths from the Japanese soldiers whom the Americans assumed would surrender. It has been asserted that the incident, along with many other perfidious actions of the Japanese throughout the Pacific War, led to an Allied tendency to shoot dead or wounded Japanese soldiers, those who were attempting to surrender and not to take POWs as readily as they might other enemy soldiers.

At the Dachau Trials, the issue of whether the donning of enemy uniforms to approach the enemy without drawing fire was within the laws of war was established under international humanitarian law at the trial in 1947 of the planner and commander of Operation Greif, Otto Skorzeny. He was found not guilty by a US military tribunal of a crime by ordering his men into action in US uniforms. He had passed on to his men the warning of German legal experts that if they fought in US uniforms, they would be breaking the laws of war. During the trial, a number of arguments were advanced to substantiate this position and that the German and US militaries seemed to be in agreement on it. In its judgement, the tribunal noted that the case did not require that the tribunal make findings other than those of guilty or not guilty and so no safe conclusion could be drawn from the acquittal of all accused. The tribunal also emphasized the difference between using enemy uniforms with the purpose of deception versus combat.

Since the Russian invasion of Ukraine in 2022, Russian soldiers have been accused of perfidy on numerous occasions, including the Makiivka surrender incident.

Israeli forces have been accused of perfidy during its occupation of the West Bank by former executive director of Human Rights Watch Kenneth Roth and Dr. Aurel Sari, an associate professor of public international law at the University of Exeter and a fellow at the Supreme Headquarters Allied Powers Europe.

During the United States strikes on alleged drug traffickers during Operation Southern Spear, the Pentagon is accused of using a secret aircraft painted to look like a civilian plane in its first boat attack.

== See also ==
- Bad faith
- False flag
- Inherent bad faith model
- Perfidious Albion
- War Crimes Act of 1996 (incorporated into US law)
