= 500th SS Parachute Battalion =

Military unit

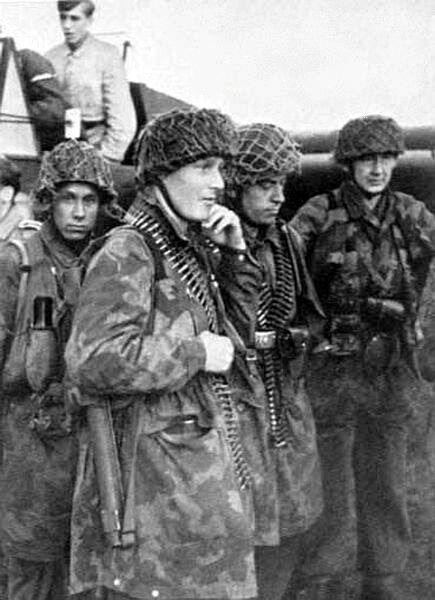
Soldiers of the battalion are getting ready for Operation Rösselsprung

The 500th SS-Parachute Battalion (German: SS-Fallschirmjägerbataillon 500) was the airborne unit of the Waffen-SS. The idea to form a paratrooper unit within the Waffen-SS allegedly came directly from Reichsführer-SS Heinrich Himmler.

== Creation ==
Adolf Hitler supposedly got the idea in September 1943, after Operation Eiche ("Oak") which was launched on 12 September and included an airborne raid on Gran Sasso. The operation was planned by Kurt Student. During this raid, a group of German parachutists freed deposed Italian dictator Benito Mussolini. Otto Skorzeny commanded the raid by order of German dictator Adolf Hitler. The raid included a daring military-based assault on the Campo Imperatore Hotel at Gran Sasso and managed to rescue Mussolini, only firing a single shot.

Considering that the new Waffen-SS unit of parachutists had to be employed in dangerous actions behind enemy lines, it was decided to extend enlistment to those in the SS disciplinary units which were formed from officers, non-commissioned officers and soldiers who had violated military law. An order of the SS-FHA (the SS High Command) fixed a percentage of 50% for the unit coming from volunteers of Waffen-SS units, the rest from volunteers from the disciplinary units.

The gathering of personnel for the new unit was in Chlum in Czechoslovakia in October 1943. The first commander of the battalion was SS-Sturmbannführer Herbert Gilhofer, coming from the 21st SS-Panzergrenadier Regiment of the 10th SS-Panzer-Division Frundsberg. In November 1943, the battalion began its training in the spa Mataruška Banja, close to Kraljevo, Serbia, with the Luftwaffe Fallschirmschule number 3. The training was completed in the area around Pápa, Hungary at the beginning of 1944. On 19 March 1944, the 500th SS parachute battalion took part in the German occupation of Hungary, Operation Margarethe.

== Operation Rösselsprung ==
The 500th was led by Hauptsturmführer Kurt Rybka during its daring but unsuccessful parachute and glider-borne assault on Tito's headquarters outside Drvar on 25 May 1944. The raid was called Operation Rösselsprung (Knight's move). Two companies were dropped directly on Tito's supposed headquarters location while the other two were landed by DFS 230 glider.

The first wave of paratroopers, following a heavy bombardment by the Luftwaffe, landed in between the area of the cave, (Tito's hideout) and the town of Drvar on open ground and many were gunned down by members of the Tito Escort Battalion, a company numbering fewer than 100 soldiers. The second wave of paratroopers missed their target altogether and landed a few miles outside the town. Tito was long gone when the paratroopers captured the cave. Tito had been forewarned and evaded capture while the numerically superior Yugoslav Partisans drove off the SS paratroopers. Over 800 of the 1,000 personnel who participated in the operation were killed or wounded.

The survivors were at first sent to Petrovac then Ljubljana, where they remained until the end of June. They were then transferred to Gotenhafen (Gdynia), West Prussia to take part in the planned occupation of the Finnish-controlled Åland Islands in the Baltic Sea, but this was cancelled. They were then sent to join III. SS-Panzerkorps at Narva, but were ordered to be flown to Kaunas, Lithuania on 9 July. There they formed a kampfgruppe with I./Panzerregiment GD to relieve the trapped German forces at Vilnius. Subsequently, they often acted as 3rd Panzer Army's 'fire brigade' in its defense of the Baltic States. By 20 August 1944, they were down to a strength of 90 men, but remained in combat for the next several months as the Germans were desperate for any and all combat troops to stave off the Soviet offensives.

The paras were finally relieved in late October and flown to Deutsch-Wagram, Austria where they were incorporated into/ renumbered the SS-Fallschirmjägerbataillon 600 after a week's rest.

=== France ===
The SS-Fallschirmjäger never fought in France. It is sometimes stated in histories of the French Resistance that SS paratroopers carried out a parachute assault in July 1944 against French partisan forces on the Vercors plateau in the French Alps where hundreds of partisans had created a stronghold from which they were mounting operations against the German occupiers. However, they were not Waffen-SS but Luftwaffe special forces from the secretive Kampfgeschwader 200. These para-trained commandos of II./KG 200 remain a little-known arm of Germany's World War II parachute forces and were listed on II./KG 200's ORBAT (Order of Battle) as the 3rd Staffel.

== 600th SS-Parachute Battalion ==
The second Budapest mission, Operation Panzerfaust, can be said to have been, officially, the 600's first mission although the new battalion was not formally mustered until 9 November 1944 in Neu-Strelitz, their garrison town. The soldiers of the 500th who survived long enough to see the formation of the 600 were also given back their previous ranks and the right to wear the sig rune on 9 November 1944.

Two companies of the newly forming SS-Fallschirmjäger-Btl 600 were then attached to Otto Skorzeny's Panzerbrigade 150 in December 1944 for the Ardennes offensive. It was the only occasion in which SS paratroopers faced the Western Allies until, fleeing the Soviets, they surrendered to US forces early in May 1945. After the Ardennes, the 600th fought on the Oder Front in the Schwedt and Zehden bridgeheads.

== See also ==
- Fallschirmjäger

== Literature ==
- Munoz, Anthonio J. Forgotten Legions: Obscure Combat Formations of the Waffen-SS. Boulder, Colorado: Paladin Press, 1991 ISBN 0-87364-646-0
- Jerzy Woydyłło: Desant na Drwar. MON, a.a.O. 1965. (polnische Monografie)
- Massimiliano Afiero, SS - Fallschirmjäger. The Battalion Parachutists SS, Lupo Editorial, 2004, 96 pages
