= Otto Skorzeny =

Austrian Waffen-SS officer (1908–1975)

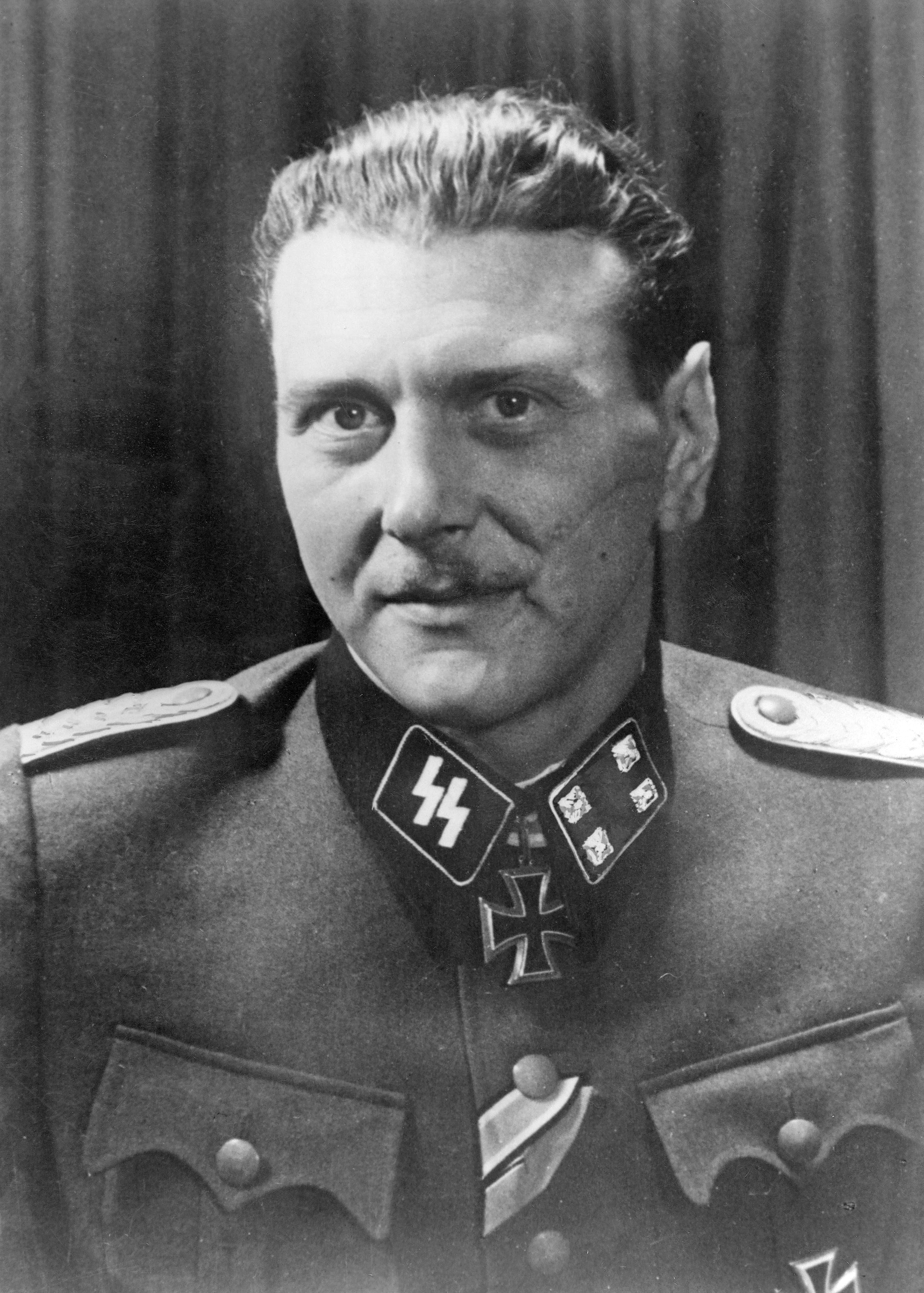
- Skorzeny in 1943
- Born: Otto Johann Anton Skorzeny; 12 June 1908; Vienna, Austria-Hungary
- Died: 5 July 1975 (aged 67); Madrid, Spain
- Military career
- Allegiance: Germany (1932–1945); Spain (1950–1975); Argentina (Note: As military advisor to Argentine president Juan Perón and as a bodyguard to first lady Eva Perón.); Egypt (Note: As military advisor to Egyptian president Gamal Abdel Nasser.); Israel (Note: First alleged by Israeli security magazine Matara in 1989. Later that year, the newspaper Yedioth Ahronoth stated during a report on the story that it managed to confirm the story through a senior Mossad source.)
- Branch: Schutzstaffel; Mossad
- Rank: SS-Standartenführer of the Reserves
- Commands: Sonderlehrgang Oranienburg; SS Panzer Brigade 150
- Conflicts: World War II; Eastern Front; Operation Oak; Operation Panzerfaust; Battle of the Bulge; Operation Greif
- Awards: Knight's Cross of the Iron Cross with Oak Leaves
- Other work: Civil engineer

Otto Johann Anton Skorzeny (12 June 1908 – 5 July 1975) was an Austrian-born German intelligence officer and commando who served as an SS-Obersturmbannführer within the Waffen-SS during the Second World War. Over the course of the conflict, he was involved with operations including the removal from power of the Hungarian regent Miklós Horthy and the raid on Gran Sasso, which secured the liberation of Benito Mussolini from captivity. Skorzeny also commanded Operation Greif, in which German personnel infiltrated Allied positions while disguised in enemy uniforms. This led to his prosecution in 1947 before the Dachau Military Tribunal on charges of violating the 1907 Hague Convention. He was acquitted.

After his escape from an internment facility in 1948, Skorzeny sought refuge on a farm in Bavaria and later resided in Salzburg and Paris before moving to Francoist Spain. In 1953, he assumed the role of military advisor to the Egyptian president Gamal Abdel Nasser, and reportedly advised the Argentine president Juan Perón, although this is disputed. Skorzeny died of lung cancer on 5 July 1975 in Madrid, at the age of sixty-seven.

== Early life ==
Skorzeny was born on 12 June 1908, in Vienna, into a middle-class Austrian family which had a long history of military service. His surname is of Polish origin, and Skorzeny's distant ancestors came from Skorzęcin in the Greater Poland region, eventually immigrating to East Prussia.

In addition to his native German, he spoke excellent French and was proficient in English. In his teens, Skorzeny once complained to his father about the austere lifestyle the family was enduring; his father replied, "There is no harm in doing without things. It might even be good for you not to get used to a soft life."

He was a noted fencer as a member of a German-national Burschenschaft while studying at the Technical University of Vienna. He engaged in fifteen personal combats. The tenth resulted in a wound that left a dramatic duelling scar, known in academic fencing as a Schmiss (German for "smite" or "hit"), on his cheek.

In May 1932, Skorzeny joined the Austrian Nazi organization and soon became a member of the Austrian branch of the Nazi Sturmabteilung (SA) in February 1934. A charismatic figure, Skorzeny played a minor role in the Anschluss on 12 March 1938 when, according to his own account, he saved the Austrian President Wilhelm Miklas from being shot by Austrian Nazis.

== Eastern Front ==
After the 1939 Invasion of Poland, Skorzeny, then working as a civil engineer, volunteered for service in the German Air Force (the Luftwaffe), but was turned down because he was considered too tall at 1.94 metres (6 ft 4 in) and too old (31 years in 1939) for aircrew training. He then joined the Waffen-SS, training with Hitler's bodyguard regiment, the Leibstandarte SS Adolf Hitler (LSSAH).

Skorzeny took part in the invasion of the Soviet Union with the SS Division Das Reich and subsequently fought in several battles on the Eastern Front. In October 1941, he was in charge of a "technical section" of German forces during the Battle of Moscow. His mission was to seize important buildings of the Communist Party, including the NKVD headquarters at Lubyanka, and the central telegraph office and other high priority facilities, before they could be destroyed. He was also ordered to capture the sluices of the Moscow-Volga Canal because Hitler wanted to turn Moscow into a huge artificial lake by opening them. The missions were cancelled since German forces had failed to capture the Soviet capital.

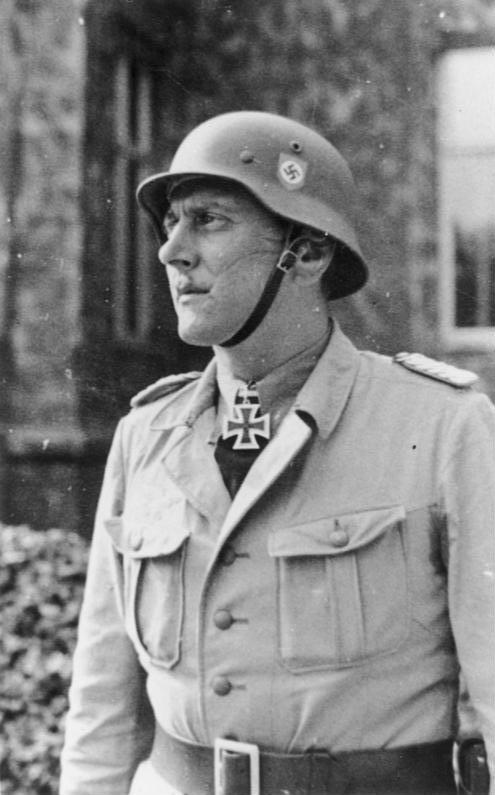
Skorzeny as commander of the Waffen SS Sonderverband z.b.V. Friedenthal special forces unit, 1943

In January 1942, Skorzeny was hit in the back of the head by shrapnel; he was evacuated to the rear for treatment. He had previously been awarded the Iron Cross, Second Class while fighting in the Yelnya bridgehead. Recuperating from his injuries he was given a staff role in Berlin, where he developed his ideas on unconventional commando warfare.

Strategically and tactically, Skorzeny's proposals were to develop units specialized in such warfare, including partisan-like fighting deep behind enemy lines, fighting in enemy uniform, sabotage attacks, etc. In April 1943 Skorzeny's name was put forward by Ernst Kaltenbrunner, the new head of the Reich Security Main Office (RSHA), and Skorzeny met with Walter Schellenberg, head of Amt VI, Ausland-SD (the SS foreign intelligence service department of the RSHA); Schellenberg charged Skorzeny with command of the schools organized to train operatives in sabotage, espionage, and paramilitary techniques. Skorzeny was appointed commander of the recently created Waffen SS Sonderverband z.b.V. Friedenthal stationed near Berlin (the unit was later renamed SS Jagdverband 502, and in November 1944 again to SS Combat Unit "Centre", expanding ultimately to five battalions).

The unit's first mission was Operation François in mid-1943. Skorzeny sent a group by parachute into Iran to make contact with the dissident mountain tribes to encourage them to sabotage Allied shipments to the Soviet Union via the Trans-Iranian Railway. However, commitment among the rebel tribes was suspect, and Operation François was deemed a failure.

== Operations by Skorzeny ==
- Operation François – Co-ordination of guerrilla operations in Iran.
- Operation Oak (Unternehmen Eiche, September 1943) – rescue of Italian dictator Benito Mussolini.
- Operation Long Jump – A planned operation to assassinate the "Big Three" (Stalin, Churchill, and Roosevelt) during the 1943 Tehran Conference. The plot was uncovered before its inception. Skorzeny denied that this operation had ever existed.
- Operation Knight's Leap (Unternehmen Rösselsprung, May 1944) – An attempt to capture Josip Broz Tito alive.
- Operation Armoured Fist (Unternehmen Panzerfaust a.k.a. Unternehmen Eisenfaust, October 1944) – kidnapping of Miklós Horthy Jr. to force his father, Admiral Miklós Horthy, to resign as Regent of Hungary in favor of Ferenc Szálasi, the pro-Nazi leader of the Arrow Cross Party.
- Operation Griffin (Unternehmen Greif, December 1944) – A false flag operation to spread disinformation during the Battle of the Bulge.
- Werwolf SS – A planned Nazi underground resistance movement in Allied-occupied Europe.

=== Liberation of Benito Mussolini ===
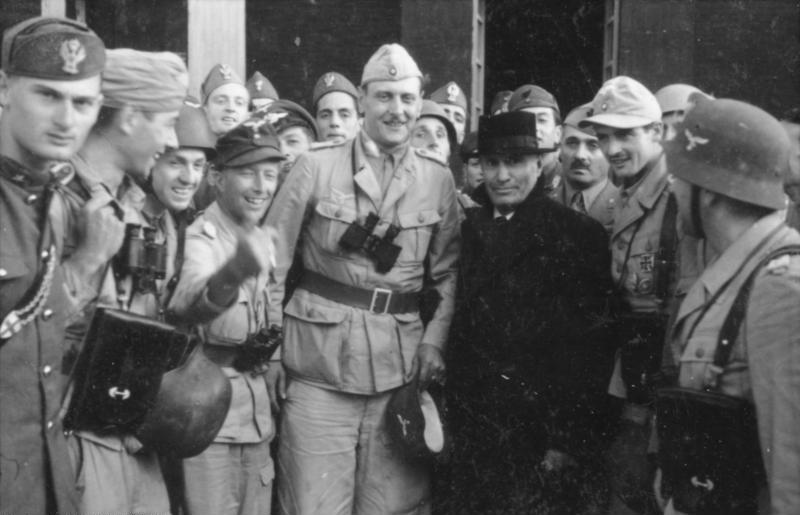
Skorzeny (centre, binoculars hanging from neck) with the liberated Mussolini – 12 September 1943

On the night between 24 and 25 July 1943, a few weeks after the Allied invasion of Sicily and bombing of Rome, the Italian Grand Council of Fascism voted a motion of no confidence (Ordine del Giorno Grandi) against Benito Mussolini. On the same day, the king replaced him with Marshal Pietro Badoglio and had him arrested.

Hitler ordered military operations to liberate Mussolini, and, as was his common procedure, he issued similar orders to competing organisations within the German military. So he ordered Skorzeny to track Mussolini, and simultaneously ordered the paratroop General Kurt Student to execute the liberation.

Mussolini was being transported around Italy by his captors (first to Ponza, then to La Maddalena, both small islands in the Tyrrhenian Sea). Intercepting a coded Italian radio message, Skorzeny used the reconnaissance provided by SS-Obersturmbannführer Herbert Kappler's network of agents and informants (helped with counterfeit British bank notes with a face value of £100,000, forged under Operation Bernhard). It was determined that Mussolini was being imprisoned at Campo Imperatore Hotel, a ski resort at Campo Imperatore in Italy's Gran Sasso massif, high in the Apennine Mountains.

On 12 September 1943, Skorzeny and 16 SS troopers joined the Fallschirmjäger to rescue Mussolini in a high-risk glider mission. Ten DFS 230 gliders, each carrying nine soldiers and a pilot, towed by Henschel Hs 126 planes started between 13:05 and 13:10 from the Pratica di Mare Air Base near Rome. The leader of the airborne operation, paratrooper-Oberleutnant Georg Freiherr von Berlepsch, entered the first glider, Skorzeny and his SS troopers sat in the fourth and fifth glider. To gain height before crossing the close by Alban Hills the leading three glider-towing plane units flew an additional loop. All following units considered this manoeuvre unnecessary and preferred not to endanger the given time of arrival at the target. This led to the situation that Skorzeny's two units arrived first over the target. Meanwhile, the valley station of the funicular railway leading to the Campo Imperatore was captured at 14:00 in a ground attack by two paratrooper companies led by Major Otto-Harald Mors, who was commander-in-chief of the whole raid. They also cut all telephone lines. At 14:05 the airborne commandos landed their ten DFS 230 gliders on the mountain near the hotel; only one crashed, causing injuries. The Fallschirmjäger and Skorzeny's special troopers overwhelmed Mussolini's captors (200 well-equipped Carabinieri guards) without a single shot being fired; this was also due to the fact that General Fernando Soleti of the Polizia dell' Africa Italiana, who flew in with Skorzeny, told them to stand down. Skorzeny attacked the radio operator and his equipment and stormed into the hotel, being followed by his SS troopers and the paratroopers. Ten minutes after the beginning of the raid, Mussolini left the hotel, accompanied by the German soldiers. At 14:45, Major Mors accessed the Hotel via the funicular railway and introduced himself to Mussolini.

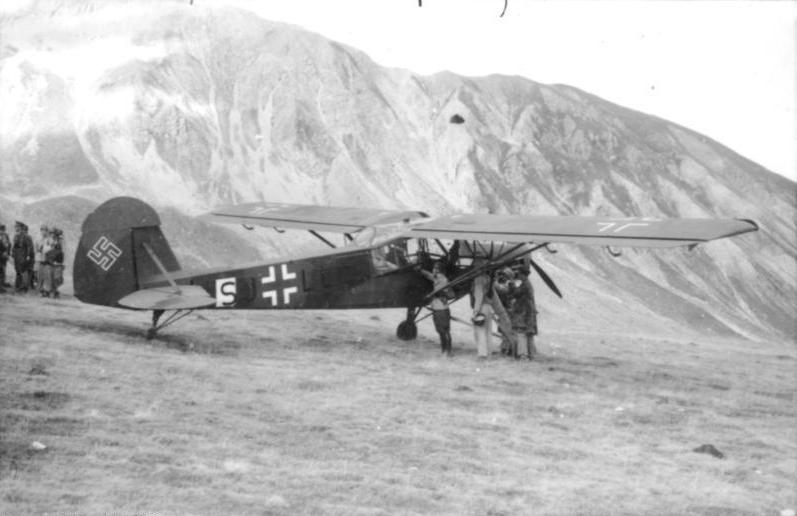
Fieseler Fi 156 Storch used to rescue Mussolini

Subsequently, Mussolini was to be flown out by a Fieseler Fi 156 STOL plane. Although under the given circumstances the small plane was overloaded, Skorzeny insisted on accompanying Mussolini, thus endangering the success of the mission. After an extremely dangerous but successful lift-off, they flew to Pratica di Mare. There they continued immediately, flying in a Heinkel He 111 to Vienna, where Mussolini stayed overnight at the Hotel Imperial. The next day he was flown to Munich and on 14 September he met Hitler at the Wolf's Lair Führer Headquarters near Rastenburg.

The landing at Campo Imperatore was in fact led by First Lieutenant Georg Freiherr von Berlepsch, commanded by Major Otto-Harald Mors and under orders from General Kurt Student, all Fallschirmjäger (German air force paratroop) officers; but Skorzeny stewarded the Italian leader right in front of the cameras. After a pro-SS propaganda coup at the behest of Reichsführer-SS Heinrich Himmler and propaganda minister Joseph Goebbels, Skorzeny and his special forces (SS-Sonderverband z. b. V. "Friedenthal") of the Waffen-SS were granted the majority of the credit for the operation.

=== Operation Long Jump ===
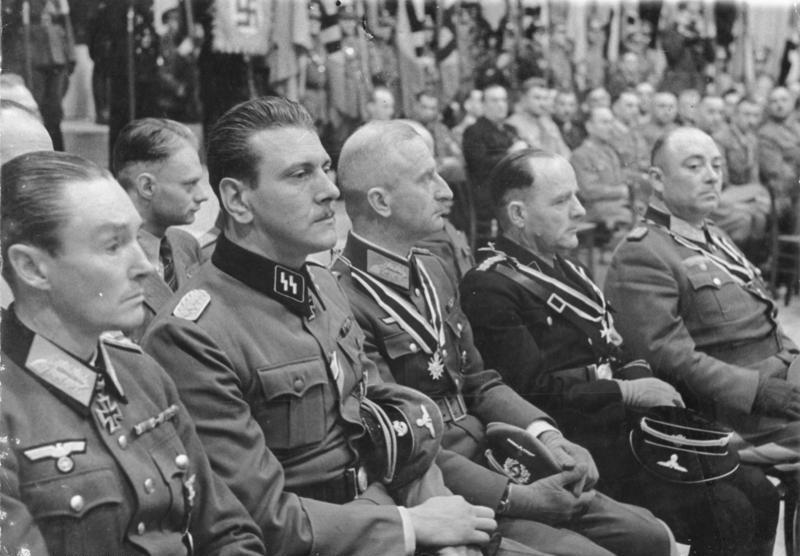
Skorzeny (2nd from left), 3 October 1943

"Operation Long Jump" was the alleged code name given to a plot to assassinate the "Big Three" (Joseph Stalin, Winston Churchill and Franklin Roosevelt) at the 1943 Tehran Conference. Hitler supposedly gave the command of the operation to Ernst Kaltenbrunner, chief of the RSHA, who, in turn, ceded the mission to Skorzeny. Knowledge of the whole scheme was presented to the Western Allies by Stalin's NKVD at the Tehran Conference. The Soviets said they had learned about its existence from counter-espionage activities against German intelligence. Their agents had found out the Nazis knew the time and place of this meeting because they had cracked a US naval code. According to the NKVD, the assassination plot was foiled after they identified the German spies in Iran forcing Skorzeny to call off the mission due to inadequate intelligence.

Following Tehran, the story was treated with incredulity by the British and Americans who dismissed it as Soviet propaganda. Skorzeny supported this view by stating in his post-war memoirs that no such operation ever existed. He said the story about the plans being leaked to Soviet spy Nikolai Kuznetsov by an SS-Sturmbannführer named Hans Ulrich von Ortel was a Soviet invention; Hans Ulrich von Ortel never existed. Skorzeny claimed his name was used only to add credibility to the story because the NKVD knew his record as an SS commando would make the existence of such an operation more plausible.

=== Raid on Drvar ===
In early 1944, Sonderverband z.b.V. Friedenthal was re-designated SS-Jäger-Bataillon 502 with Skorzeny staying on as commander. They were assigned to Operation Rösselsprung, known subsequently as the Raid on Drvar. Rösselsprung was a commando operation meant to capture the Yugoslav commander-in-chief, Marshal Josip Broz Tito, who had also recently been recognized by the Allies as the Yugoslav prime minister. Marshal Tito led the Yugoslav Partisan resistance army from his headquarters near the Bosnian town of Drvar, in the centre of a large area held by the Partisans.

Hitler knew Tito was receiving Allied support and was aware that either British or American troops might land in Dalmatia along the Adriatic coastline with support from the Partisans. Killing or capturing Tito would not only hinder this, it would give a badly needed boost to the morale of Axis forces engaged in occupied Yugoslavia. Skorzeny was involved in planning Rösselsprung and was intended to command it. However, he argued against implementation after he visited Zagreb and discovered that the operation had been compromised through the carelessness of German agents in the Nazi-affiliated Independent State of Croatia in occupied Yugoslav territory.

Rösselsprung was put into action nonetheless, but it was a complete disaster. The first wave of paratroopers, following heavy bombardment by the Luftwaffe, jumped between Tito's hideout in a cave and the town of Drvar; they landed on open ground and many were promptly shot by members of the Tito Escort Battalion, a unit numbering fewer than a hundred soldiers. The second wave of paratroopers missed their target and landed several miles out of town. Tito was long gone before paratroopers reached the cave; a trail at the back of the cave led to the railway tracks where Tito boarded a train that took him safely to Jajce. In the meantime, the Partisan 1st Brigade, from the 6th Lika Partisan Division, arrived after a twelve-mile (nineteen-kilometre) forced march and attacked the Waffen-SS paratroopers, inflicting heavy casualties.

=== Hungary and Operation Panzerfaust ===
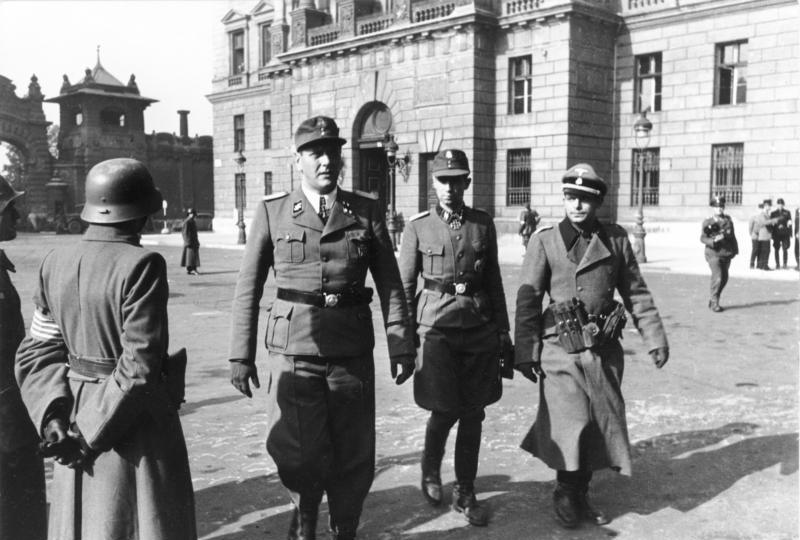
Otto Skorzeny (left), Adrian von Fölkersam (middle), in Budapest, 16 October 1944

In October 1944, Hitler sent Skorzeny to Hungary after receiving word that the Regent of Hungary, Admiral Miklós Horthy, was secretly negotiating with the Red Army. The surrender of Hungary would have cut off the million German troops still fighting in the Balkans.

Skorzeny, in a daring "snatch" codenamed Operation Panzerfaust (known as Operation Eisenfaust in Germany), kidnapped Horthy's son Miklós Horthy Jr. and forced his father to resign as head of state. A pro-Nazi government under dictator Ferenc Szálasi was then installed in Hungary. In April 1945, after German and Hungarian forces were driven out of Hungary, Szálasi and his Arrow Cross Party-based forces continued the fight in Austria and Slovakia. The success of the operation earned Skorzeny promotion to Obersturmbannführer.

=== Operation Greif and the German defeat ===
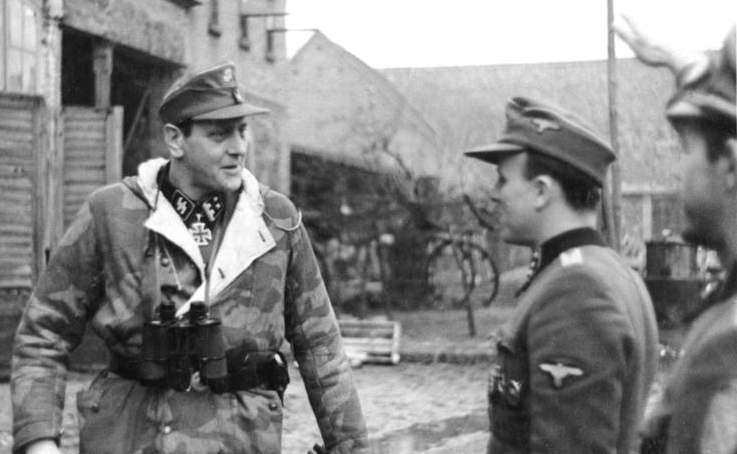
Skorzeny in Brandenburg visiting the 500th SS Parachute Battalion, February 1945

As part of the German Ardennes offensive in late 1944 (Battle of the Bulge), Skorzeny's English-speaking troops were charged with infiltrating American lines disguised in American uniforms in order to produce confusion to support the German attack. For the campaign, Skorzeny was the commander of a composite unit, the 150th SS Panzer Brigade. As planned by Skorzeny, Operation Greif involved about two dozen German soldiers, most of them in captured American Jeeps and disguised in American uniforms, who would penetrate American lines in the early hours of the Battle of the Bulge to cause disorder and confusion. Skorzeny was well aware that under the Hague Convention of 1907, any of his men captured while wearing American uniforms would be executed as spies and this possibility caused much discussion with Generaloberst Alfred Jodl and Field Marshal Gerd von Rundstedt.

A handful of his men were captured and spread a rumour that Skorzeny personally was leading a raid on Paris to kill or capture General Eisenhower, who was not amused by having to spend Christmas 1944 isolated for security reasons. Eisenhower retaliated by ordering an all-out manhunt for Skorzeny, with "Wanted" posters distributed throughout Allied-controlled territories featuring a detailed description and a photograph. In all, twenty-three of Skorzeny's men were captured behind American lines and sixteen were executed as spies for contravening the rules of war by wearing enemy uniforms.

Skorzeny spent February 1945 as an acting major general commanding about 5,000 troops, only some of which were his SS commandos and paratroopers, during the defense of the Schwedt Bridgehead on the River Oder. On 17 March, he received orders to sabotage the last remaining intact bridge across the Rhine at Remagen following its capture by the Allies, but the damaged bridge collapsed that same day, and the naval demolitions squad that had been preparing its destruction instead unsuccessfully attacked a nearby Allied pontoon bridge between Kripp and Linz. Hitler awarded him one of Germany's highest military honours, the Oak Leaves to the Knight's Cross.

== Post-war ==
=== Dachau trials ===
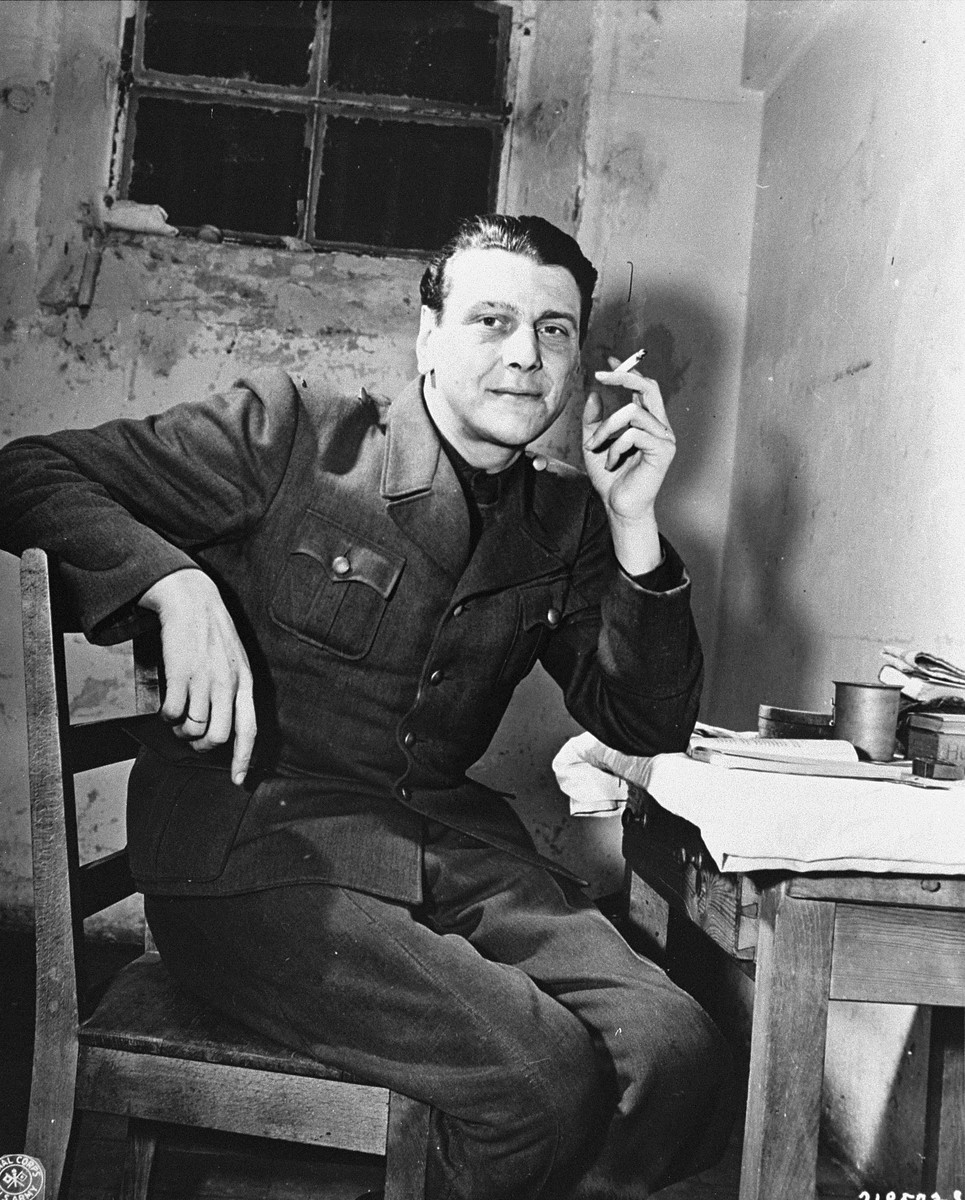
Waiting in a cell as a witness at the Nuremberg trials – 24 November 1945

Skorzeny was interned for two years before being tried as a war criminal at the Dachau trials in 1947 for allegedly violating the laws of war during the Battle of the Bulge. He and nine officers of the Panzerbrigade 150 were tried before an American military tribunal in Dachau on 18 August 1947. They faced charges of improper use of American military insignia, theft of American uniforms, and theft of Red Cross parcels from American POWs. The trial lasted over three weeks. The charge of stealing Red Cross parcels was dropped for lack of evidence. Skorzeny admitted to ordering his men to wear American uniforms, but his defence argued that as long as enemy uniforms were discarded before combat started, such a tactic was a legitimate ruse de guerre.

On the final day of the trial, 8 September, F. F. E. Yeo-Thomas, a former British SOE agent, testified in defence of Skorzeny and his operatives wearing American uniforms behind enemy lines, claiming that the Western Allies had actively contemplated carrying out exactly the same kind of "false flag" operations; the Tribunal subsequently acquitted the ten defendants. The Tribunal drew a distinction between using enemy uniforms during combat and for other purposes including deception and were unable to prove that Skorzeny had given any orders to fight in American uniforms.

=== Escape from prison ===
Skorzeny was detained in an internment camp at Darmstadt awaiting the decision of a denazification court. On 27 July 1948, he escaped from the camp with the help of three former SS officers dressed in American military police uniforms who entered the camp and claimed that they had been ordered to take Skorzeny to Nuremberg for a legal hearing. Skorzeny afterwards maintained that American authorities had aided his escape and had supplied the uniforms.

Skorzeny hid at a farm in Bavaria which had been rented by Countess Ilse Lüthje, the niece of Hjalmar Schacht (Hitler's former finance minister), for around 18 months, during which time he was in contact with Reinhard Gehlen, and together with Hartmann Lauterbacher (former deputy head of the Hitler Youth) recruited for the Gehlen Organization. Skorzeny was photographed at a café on the Champs Elysées in Paris on 13 February 1950. The photo appeared in the French press the next day, causing him to move to Salzburg, where he met up with German veterans and also filed for divorce so that he could marry Lüthje.

Shortly afterwards, with the help of a Nansen passport issued by the Spanish government, he moved to Madrid, where he set up a small engineering business. In April 1950, the publication of Skorzeny's memoirs by the French newspaper Le Figaro caused 1,500 communists to riot outside the journal's headquarters.

=== Military advisor ===
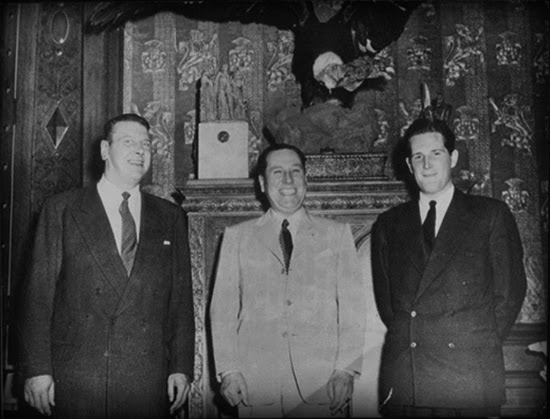
Skorzeny (left) and Juan Perón (center)

In 1952 Egypt was taken over by General Mohammed Naguib. Skorzeny was sent to Egypt the following year by former General Reinhard Gehlen (who was now working indirectly for the CIA) to act as Naguib's military adviser. Skorzeny recruited a staff made up of former SS and Wehrmacht officers to train the Egyptian army. Among these officers were former Wehrmacht generals Wilhelm Fahrmbacher and Oskar Munzel; the head of the Gestapo Department for Jewish Affairs in occupied Poland Leopold Gleim; and Joachim Daemling, former chief of the Gestapo in Düsseldorf. In addition to training the army, Skorzeny also trained Arab volunteers in commando tactics for possible use against British troops stationed in the Suez Canal zone. Several Arabs also received commando training, and Skorzeny planned their raids into Israel via the Gaza Strip in 1953–1954. One of these was Yasser Arafat. He stayed on to serve as an adviser to Egyptian President Gamal Abdel Nasser. (Note: "...early in the Egyptian-American relationship, we began to suspect that Nasser was employing experts other than those we provided...Our suspicions were confirmed when former SS Colonel Otto Skorzeny dropped in on our station chief in Madrid to inform him that he had been approached by the Military Attache in the Egyptian Embassy there to request his assistance in recruiting German army officers who might find Egypt a convenient place to hide out from Nazi hunters. Could the CIA help? Indeed, we could. With Otto's help, the CIA officer working with General Gehlen in Pullach chose some German generals, colonels and majors who were so stupid that they could be counted upon to screw up the Egyptian army so thoroughly that it wouldn't be able to find its way from Cairo to Ismailia, let alone fighting the British after arriving there...Most of them (the Nazis) were anti-Arab, although they had the wit to conceal that fact.")

According to some authors, he traveled between Spain and Argentina, where he acted as an advisor to President Juan Perón and as a bodyguard for Eva Perón, while fostering an ambition for the "Fourth Reich" to be centred in Latin America.

=== Alleged Recruitment by Mossad ===
The Israeli security and intelligence magazine Matara published an article in 1989 claiming that Skorzeny had been recruited by Mossad in 1963 to obtain information on German scientists who were working on an Egyptian project to develop rockets to be used against Israel. Reporting on the Matara story, the major Israeli daily newspaper Yedioth Ahronot said that it had confirmed the story from their own senior Mossad source. Former Mossad head Isser Harel confirmed the story that former Nazis were recruited to provide intelligence on Arab countries.

Ian Black and Benny Morris wrote in 1991 that Skorzeny may not have known for whom he was working, but in 2010, Tom Segev published in his biography of Simon Wiesenthal that Skorzeny had offered to help only if Wiesenthal removed him from his list of wanted war criminals. Wiesenthal refused, but Skorzeny finally agreed to help anyway. Segev gave as his main source the senior Mossad agent Rafi Meidan to whom Segev attributes the primary role in the recruitment of Skorzeny.

Further details of the story were published by Yossi Melman and Dan Raviv in 2016. According to their information, a Mossad team had started to develop a plan to kill Skorzeny, but chief Isser Harel decided to attempt to recruit him instead, as a man on the inside would greatly enhance their ability to target Nazis who were providing military assistance to Egypt. He allegedly was recruited and conducted operations for Mossad from 1964, working with Avraham Ahituv and Rafi Eitan.

Other unnamed sources asserted that Skorzeny was recruited after Mossad visited his home in Spain, where he expected that he would be assassinated. After undergoing instruction and training in Mossad's facilities in Israel, the rumoured work for Mossad included assassinating German rocket scientist Heinz Krug who was working for the Egyptian government and posting a letter bomb which killed five Egyptians at the Egyptian military rocket site Factory 333. He also allegedly supplied the names and addresses of German scientists working for Egypt and the names of European front companies supplying military hardware to Egypt.

No confirmed source can explain Skorzeny's motives for working with Israel, but he may have craved adventure and intrigue and feared assassination by Mossad. An article featured in Der Spiegel on 22 January 2018 raised doubts as to the involvement of Skorzeny in Krug's death, stating that Mossad boss Isser Harel ordered the murder.

=== Other activities ===
Like thousands of other former Nazis, Skorzeny was declared entnazifiziert (denazified) in absentia in 1952 by a West German government arbitration board, which meant that he could now travel from Spain into other Western countries, on a special Nansen passport for stateless persons with which he visited Ireland in 1957 and 1958. In late 1958, he qualified for an Austrian passport and in 1959, he purchased Martinstown House (53.1074°N 6.8218°W), a 165-acre (67 ha) farm near The Curragh in County Kildare, Ireland. Although Skorzeny could not be refused entry without due cause, he was refused a residency visa by the Irish government and had to limit his stays to six weeks at a time, and he was monitored by G2. He rarely visited after 1963 and sold Martinstown House in 1971. At 6 ft 4 in (193 cm) and weighing 110 kilograms (240 lb), along with his scar, he was easily recognizable and caused speculation among the English and Irish press as to why he was in Ireland. One Kildare resident recalled Skorzeny as someone who "wasn't particularly friendly and [who] didn't really mix with local people". Skorzeny also owned property on Mallorca.

In the 1960s, Skorzeny set up the Paladin Group, which he envisioned as "an international directorship of strategic assault personnel [that would] straddle the watershed between paramilitary operations carried out by troops in uniform and the political warfare which is conducted by civilian agents". Based near Alicante, Spain, the Paladin Group specialized in arming and training guerrillas. Some of its operatives were recruited by the Spanish Interior Ministry to wage a clandestine war against the separatist group ETA. Skorzeny was a founder and an advisor to the leadership of the Spanish neo-Nazi group CEDADE, established in 1966.

On 24 February 1975, as he left the studios of French television in Paris, he was whipped by a former officer of the French Army, who was unarmed but threatened to kill him on the spot. The killing was prevented by the police. The story appeared on Le Monde two days later.

It was rumoured that under the cover names Robert Steinbacher and Otto Steinbauer and supported by either Nazi funds or (according to some sources) by Austrian intelligence, Skorzeny set up a secret organization named Die Spinne (English: "The Spider"), which helped as many as 600 former SS men escape from Germany to Spain and Argentina, and from there to other countries. (Note: "Such was Mr. Skorzeny's reputation and his blind loyalty to Hitler that long after the end of the war—in fact, almost to the very end of his life—he was said to be involved in coups and assassination plots and the organization of a Nazi network called Die Spinne (The Spider) operating out of a seaside resort in Spain.")

== Aliases ==
In his clandestine post-war life, Skorzeny was known to have used numerous aliases according to foreign intelligence agencies.

As early as 1951, the United States foreign service was briefed of his whereabouts in Spain, under the assumed name of Rolf Steinbauer.

A decade later, the CIA was aware of other aliases used by Skorzeny during his life as an emigre: Rolf Steiner and Otto Steinbauer.

== Death ==
In 1970, a cancerous tumour was discovered on Skorzeny's spine. Two tumours were later removed while he was staying at a hospital in Hamburg, leaving him temporarily paralyzed. Skorzeny died of lung cancer on 5 July 1975 in Madrid. He was 67 years old. Skorzeny never denounced Nazism.

He was given a Catholic funeral in Madrid on 7 August 1975. His body was then cremated and his ashes were later taken to Vienna to be interred in the Skorzeny family plot at Döblinger Friedhof. His funerals in Madrid and Vienna were attended by former SS colleagues who gave the Nazi salute, and also sang some of Hitler's favourite songs.

== In fiction ==
Like many other prominent World War II figures, Skorzeny has been portrayed in several works of fiction, such as the Worldwar tetralogy by Harry Turtledove and 1945 by Newt Gingrich and William R. Forstchen. In The Eagle has Landed by Jack Higgins, Skorzeny's rescue of Mussolini inspires a plan to kidnap Winston Churchill.

Skorzeny was portrayed in the television drama series Mussolini: The Untold Story and Mussolini and I, and the drama film Walking with the Enemy (2014). The Spanish drama-series Jaguar is inspired by Skorzeny.

== Awards ==
- Iron Cross (1939)
  - 2nd Class (26 August 1941)
  - 1st Class (12 September 1943)
- Eastern Front Medal (2 September 1942)
- Wound Badge in Black (18 August 1943)
- Pilot/Observer Badge (with Diamonds) (16 September 1943) (Honorary Recipient)
- German Cross in Gold (16 October 1944)
- Honour Roll Clasp of the Heer & Waffen-SS (5 February 1945)
- Knight's Cross of the Iron Cross with Oak Leaves
  - Knight's Cross on 13 September 1943 as SS-Hauptsturmführer of the Reserves and commander of Sonderverband z.b.V. Friedenthal
  - 826th Oak Leaves on 9 April 1945 as SS-Obersturmbannführer of the Reserves and commander of the SS-Jagd-Verbände and combat commander of Schwedt an der Oder

== Promotions ==
Skorzeny was promoted as follows:

| 1 May 1940: | SS-Unterscharführer |
| 1 September 1940: | SS-Oberscharführer |
| 30 January 1941: | SS-Untersturmführer of the Reserves |
| 20 April 1941: | SS-Obersturmführer of the Reserves |
| 20 April 1943: | SS-Hauptsturmführer of the Reserves |
| 12 September 1943: | SS-Sturmbannführer of the Reserves |
| 16 October 1944: | SS-Obersturmbannführer of the Reserves, effective as of 16 October 1944 |
| 20 April 1945: | SS-Standartenführer of the Reserves |
