= Ruse de guerre =

Act of military deception

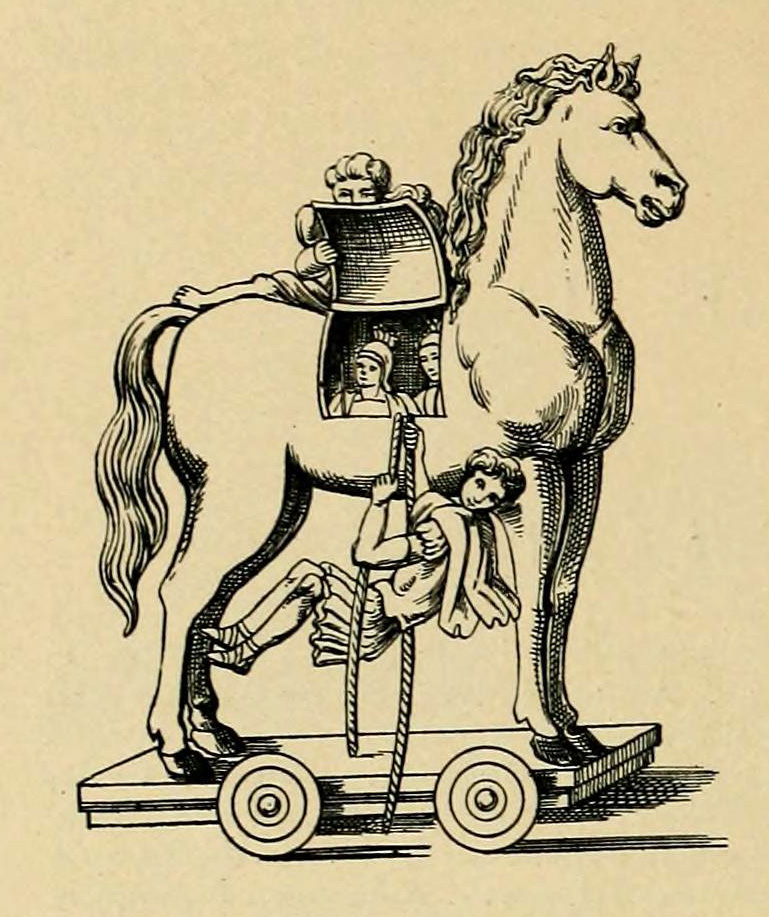
An illustration of the Trojan Horse, from Histoire des jouets

The French ruse de guerre, sometimes literally translated as ruse of war, is a non-uniform term; generally what is understood by "ruse of war" can be separated into two groups. The first classifies the phrase purely as an act of military deception against one's opponent; the second emphasizes acts against one's opponent by creative, clever, unorthodox means, sometimes involving force multipliers or superior knowledge. The term stratagem, from Ancient Greek strategema (στρατήγημα, 'act of generalship'), is also used in this sense.

Ruses de guerre are described from ancient to modern times, both in semi-mythical accounts and in well-documented events; they also feature in fiction. The term ruse de guerre is given legal meaning within the law of war (or, rules of war). Good faith is required, but at least 17 different types of ruse, including ambushes, false radio messages, the use of spies and the use of dummy guns, are considered legitimate as long as they do not involve treachery or perfidy. Landmines and similar traps can be considered perfidious under the rules in certain circumstances. Explicitly prohibited ruses under article 23 of the Hague Convention of 1907 include improper use of a flag of truce or the military insignia of the enemy.

== Examples ==
=== Ancient times ===
According to the mythical account of the Epic Cycle, the Greeks during the Trojan War pretended to give up their fruitless ten-year siege of the city of Troy and sailed away, leaving behind the Trojan Horse. After the Trojans pulled what they believed was a parting gift within the walls of the city, soldiers that had hidden inside the hollow horse during the previous night emerged and opened the city's gates, allowing the awaiting army to enter the city.

Prior to a naval battle with King Eumenes II of Pergamon, Hannibal sent a herald with a message for the opposing commander. That was a trick aiming to locate Eumenes's ship so that Hannibal could concentrate his forces against it.

Alexander the Great walked his men up and down a river continuously to condition his opponent, Porus, into a false sense of security in the belief that his whole army was searching for a ford. Then, under the cover of night Alexander marched a contingent of his men upriver and crossed the Indus, while his remaining forces marched south to their camp as they usually did. This feint allowed Alexander to hide his troops' location and win the Battle of Hydaspes in 326 BC.

As stated in the probably fictional account in Romance of the Three Kingdoms, Zhuge Liang tricked Sima Yi using the Empty Fort Strategy from Sun Tzu's The Art of War. Zhuge Liang sat upon the walls of the cities, his men far outnumbered by the Wei army which was advancing toward him. Zhuge Liang sat upon the walls and played his instrument, seemingly calm and composed, tricking Sima Yi into thinking that the Shu troops had hidden in the surrounding area for an ambush. Zhuge Liang was able to quickly flee the area as the Wei retreated.

=== Modern history ===
==== 19th century ====
The Siege of Detroit was an early engagement in the War of 1812, where a smaller British-First Nations force, led by Major-General Isaac Brock and Shawnee leader Tecumseh, used bluff and deception to intimidate Brigadier General William Hull into surrendering the fort, the town of Detroit, and a dispirited American force that nevertheless outnumbered the British and First Nations. Intercepting American dispatches from Fort Detroit, Brock judged the morale of the American garrison to be low, and that the American general had a fear of First Nations in particular. Brock arranged for misleading letters to fall into American hands, stating an inflated figure of 5,000 First Nations warriors were already in Amherstburg, to simulate a larger First Nations force had attached themselves to his army. Prior to the siege, Brock also sent a letter demanding for surrender to Hull, stating:

The force at my disposal authorizes me to require the immediate surrender of Detroit. It is far from my intention to join in a war of extermination, but you must be aware, that the numerous body of Indians who have attached themselves to my troops, will be beyond my control the moment the contest commences.

— Major-General Isaac Brock

To further the illusion that a large First Nations force was attached with Brock's force, Tecumseh extended his men, and marched them three times through an opening in the woods at the rear of the fort in full view of the fort. Brock similarly dressed members of the Canadian militia as British regulars, and instructed soldiers to light individual fires instead of one fire per unit, thereby creating the illusion of a much larger army.

Use of deception to mask an inferior force was also used in another battle during the War of 1812, the Battle of Chateauguay. Outnumbered during battle, the Canadian Fencibles were initially outflanked and falling back, before Lieutenant-Colonel Charles de Salaberry of the Canadian Voltigeurs ordered bugle calls, cheers and Indian war whoops, in a ruse to make the Americans believe that they were about to be enveloped. Fearing themselves outnumbered and about to be outflanked, Brigadier-General Wade Hampton called off the American advance, withdrawing his forces to Plattsburgh, New York.

During the American Civil War, Union General George Meade's General Order No. 13 of 1865 was retracted after it was determined that his criticism of Brigadier-General McLaughlin was based on "nothing more than the obvious result of those ruses de guerre, by which the very best officers may, at times, be victimized", after the Confederate Army falsely claimed that it had gained a foothold in the Union Army lines.

==== 20th century ====
An effort by the Imperial Japanese Navy to lure the Russian fleet out of its harbor during the Russo-Japanese War in 1904 was described by The New York Times as "a clever ruse of war to entice the Russian ships out of Port Arthur".

The use of the American flag flown on the liner Lusitania while crossing through the Irish Sea to avoid attack by German submarines during the First World War was criticized in debate in the United States House of Representatives by Republican Eben Martin of South Dakota, who stated that "the United States cannot be made a party to a ruse of war where the national colors are involved".

During the Second World War, the crew of the merchant-raiding German light cruiser Emden rigged a dummy fourth funnel on top of her radio room to disguise her as a British cruiser, most of which were equipped with four funnels. During First and Second World Wars, Q-ships were heavily armed merchant ships with concealed weaponry, designed to lure submarines into making surface attacks. This gave Q-ships the chance to open fire and sink them.

During the Second Sino-Japanese War, the former Imperial Japanese Navy battleship Asahi, which had been taken out of reserve shortly after the outbreak of war for use as a troop transport but then converted to a repair ship, was fitted with dummy wooden main batteries fore and aft to resemble an old battleship after her arrival in Shanghai on 29 December 1938.

In the lead up to the First Battle of Sirte during the Second World War, the fast minelayer HMS Abdiel successfully impersonated a force of two battleships using false signals traffic, as part of a decoy mission against Italian forces.

The Allied combined operations raid on the Normandie Dock in Saint Nazaire employed several legitimate (see below) ruses during their voyage up the Loire estuary, including flying German colours and replying to signal challenges by giving misleading replies in German. These measures were all designed to buy time for the attacking force. When these tactics ceased to be effective and German shore batteries opened fire in earnest, all the British ships lowered their German colours and hoisted White Ensigns before returning fire.

German commando Otto Skorzeny led his troops wearing American uniforms to infiltrate American lines in Operation Greif during the Battle of the Bulge. Skorzeny later reported that he was told by experts in military law that wearing American uniforms was a defensible ruse de guerre, provided his troops took off their American uniforms, and put on German uniforms, prior to firing their weapons. Skorzeny was acquitted by a United States military court in Dachau in 1947, after his defense counsel argued that the "wearing of American uniforms was a legitimate ruse of war for espionage and sabotage" as described by The New York Times.

== In relation to the rules of war ==
=== Good faith ===
According to the rules of war, good faith in dealing with the enemy must be observed as a rule of conduct, but this does not prevent measures such as using spies and secret agents, encouraging defection or insurrection among the enemy civilian population, corrupting enemy civilians or soldiers by bribes, or inducing the enemy's soldiers to desert, surrender, or rebel. In general, a belligerent may resort to those measures for mystifying or misleading the enemy against which the enemy ought to take measures to protect itself.

=== Legitimate ruses ===
Legitimate ruses include:

- surprises; ambushes; feigned attacks, retreats, or flights;
- simulating quiet and inactivity (to lull the enemy into complacency);
- use of small forces to simulate large units (for example, inducing an enemy unit to surrender by pretending that it is surrounded by a large force);
- transmitting false or misleading radio or telephone messages;
- deception of the enemy by bogus orders purporting to have been issued by the enemy commander;
- making use of the enemy's signals and passwords or secret handshakes;
- pretending to communicate with nonexistent troops or reinforcements;
- deceptive supply movements (which might make the enemy think you are preparing for action when you're not);
- deliberate planting of false information;
- use of spies and secret agents;
- moving landmarks (to confuse the enemy operating in unfamiliar territory);
- putting up dummy guns and vehicles or laying dummy mines;
- erection of dummy installations and airfields (to intimidate or encourage useless attack);
- removing unit identifications (but not those that identify the belligerent while in combat) from uniforms;
- psychological warfare activities;
- disguising a warship to appear to be a neutral merchant vessel, or a merchant vessel on the side of one's opponent, has traditionally been considered a legitimate ruse de guerre, provided the belligerent raises their own flag to break the deception before firing their guns. This was called sailing under false colors. Both sides during the world wars used this tactic, most famously the Royal Navy's Q ships. The German raider Kormoran used this tactic against the superior HMAS Sydney, disguising herself as the Dutch merchant vessel Straat Malakka prior to their mutually destructive engagement.
- disguising a warship to appear to be one of the warships of one's opponent has traditionally been considered to be a legitimate ruse de guerre, provided the belligerent raises their own flag to drop the disguise, prior to firing their guns. The Germans took steps to disguise their pocket battleships as Allied cruisers during the Second World War. This tactic was also used by the Royal Navy to great effect during the Napoleonic Wars, since the boarding and capture of enemy vessels was quite common during that time, and information about the current ownership of vessels was not easy to disseminate rapidly.

=== No perfidy ===
Further, according to the rules of war, ruses of war are legitimate so long as they do not involve perfidy on the part of the belligerent resorting to them. They are, however, forbidden if they contravene any generally accepted rule.

- traps that are attached or associated in any way with:
  - sick, wounded, or dead;
  - burial, cremation, or graves;

=== Prohibited ruses ===
Article 23 of the 1907 Hague Convention IV – The Laws and Customs of War on Land provides that: "It is especially forbidden....(b) To kill or wound treacherously individuals belonging to the hostile nation or army....(f) To make improper use of a flag of truce, of the national flag, or of the military insignia and military uniform of the enemy, as well as the distinctive badges of the Geneva Convention". Protocol I of the Geneva Conventions expanded the rules of prohibiting certain type of ruses as defined in Articles 37, 38, and 39.

The line of demarcation between legitimate ruses and forbidden acts of perfidy is sometimes indistinct. In general, it would be an improper practice to secure an advantage over the enemy by deliberate lying or misleading conduct which involves a breach of faith, or when there is a moral obligation to speak the truth. For example, it is improper to pretend to surrender to secure an advantage over the opposing belligerent.

To broadcast to the enemy that an armistice had been agreed upon when such is not the case would be treacherous. Abuse of the protections afforded to medical personnel (by disguising combat soldiers as medics, or by putting a red cross on a combat vehicle) is also considered unacceptable. In August 1946, a German soldier, Heinz Hagendorf, was found guilty by a U.S. military tribunal at the Dachau Trials and sentenced to six months imprisonment for having "wrongfully used the Red Cross emblem in a combat zone by firing a weapon at American soldiers from an enemy ambulance displaying such emblem." The verdict and sentence were upheld on appeal.

== See also ==
- Good faith – Intention to be fair, open, and honest
  - Good faith (law) – Implied covenant of honesty and fair dealing in contract law
