= Michael Bar-Zohar =

Israeli politician (born 1938)

- מיכאל בר-זהר
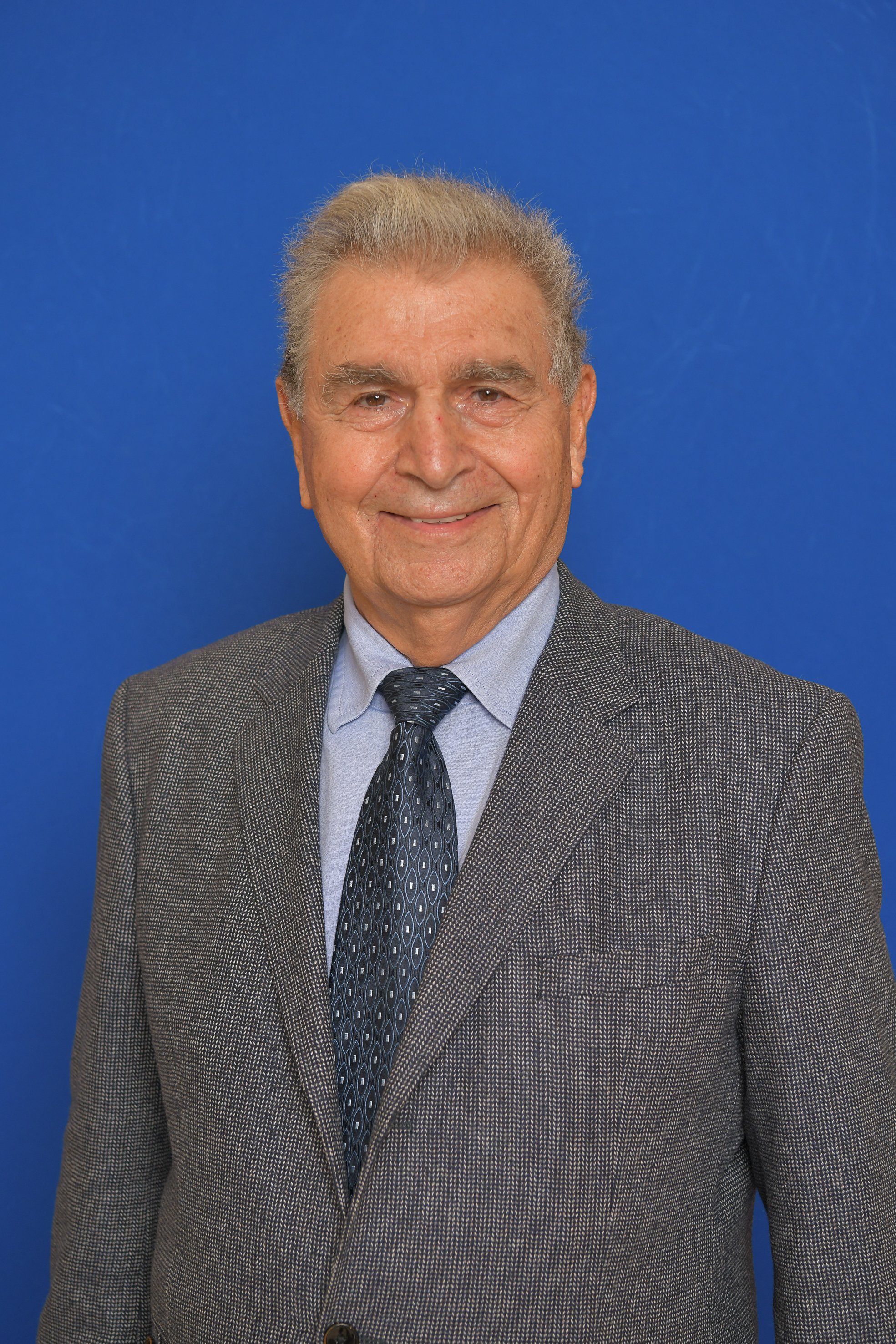

Faction represented in the Knesset
- 1981–1984: Alignment
- 1988–1991: Alignment
- 1991–1992: Labor Party

Personal details
- Born: 30 January 1938 (age 88) Sofia, Bulgaria

Michael Bar-Zohar (Hebrew: מיכאל בר-זהר; born 30 January 1938) is an Israeli historian, novelist and politician. He was a member of the Knesset on behalf of the Alignment and Labor Party in the 1980s and early '90s.

== Biography ==
Born in Bulgaria, Bar-Zohar immigrated to Israel in 1948. He attended High School Heh in Tel Aviv and went on to study economics and international relations at the Hebrew University of Jerusalem. He also studied at the Institute of Political Science in the University of Paris, where he earned a PhD.

He became science editor for Davar, a weekly newspaper in 1958, but left the job the following year. Between 1960 and 1964 he wrote for LaMerhav, an Israeli newspaper in Paris. In 1967 he became a spokesman for the Israeli Ministry of Defense, and later lectured at the University of Haifa between 1970 and 1973.

=== Political career ===
Bar-Zohar became involved in politics in the 1960s, and joined Rafi upon its foundation in 1965. Rafi merged into the Alignment in 1968, forming the Labor Party, with Bar-Zohar becoming a Labor Party member, eventually joining its central committee.

He was first elected to the Knesset in the 1981 elections on the Alignment's list and was a member of the Education and Culture Committee. Although he lost his seat in the 1984 election, he regained it in the 1988 elections, after which he was appointed chairman of the Education and Culture Committee. As a protégé of Moshe Dayan, Bar-Zohar was known as a hawk within the Labor Party. He lost his seat in the 1992 election and did not return to the Knesset, despite running in Labor Party primaries in the 1990s. In 2008 he joined the new Yisrael Hazaka party formed by Ephraim Sneh, which failed to win a seat in the 2009 election.

=== Writings ===
In 1965 Bar-Zohar won the Sokolov Award for his achievements as a journalist. He published several books, including biographies of David Ben-Gurion and Shimon Peres, several books about the Israeli security organizations, and an account of the rescue of Bulgarian Jews from the Nazis in World War II.

Bar-Zohar's book Mossad: The Great Operations (המוסד - המבצעים הגדולים), published in 2010 with Nissim Mishal, was the subject of an investigation by the newspaper Haaretz. According to the report, large parts of the book were copied from books and articles of journalist Ronen Bergman without acknowledgement. It even used fictitious names for an intelligence unit and an intelligence officer that Bergman had invented. Bar-Zohar and Mishal admitted to Haaretz that they had followed Bergman closely, but said it was in order to avoid trouble from the Israeli Military Censor. The three authors reached an agreement which included financial compensation for Bergman. Bergman later claimed that Bar-Zohar and Mishal had violated the agreement, and he wrote to foreign publishers in an attempt to prevent publication of the international edition of Bar-Zohar and Mishal's book. In August 2013, Bar-Zohar and Mishal responded with a libel suit against Bergman. In November 2013, Bergman initiated a lawsuit against Bar-Zohar and Mishal, alleging plagiarism, intellectual property theft, defamation of character and more.

== Published works ==
- A Bridge Over the Mediterranean: Franco-Israeli Relations Between 1947-1964 (1964)
- Hunting for the German Scientists (1965)
- The Longest Month (1965)
- The Avengers (1968)
- The Paratroopers Book (1969)
- The Custodian: Isser Harel and the Adventures of the Shin Bet (1970)
- Spies in the promised land Houghton Mifflin (1972) ISBN 0-395-13641-5 ISBN 978-0395136416
- The Third Truth Houghton Mifflin (1973) ISBN 0-395-15458-8 and in paperback under the name Michael Hastings by Collier/Macmillan (1973) ISBN 0-02--043560-6 as part of the Collier Spymaster Series.
- The Spy Who Died Twice Houghton Mifflin (1975) ISBN 0-395-19417-2
- Ben Gurion: a biography (centennial edition). New York: Adama Books, 1986 (c.1978). ISBN 0-915361-59-0 (hc) ISBN 0-915361-60-4 (pbk)
- Beyond Hitler's grasp: the heroic rescue of Bulgaria's Jews. Holbrook, Mass.: Adams Media. 1998. ISBN 1-58062-060-4..
- The Quest for The Red Prince: The Israeli Hunt for Ali Hassan Salameh the PLO leader who masterminded the Olympic Games Massacre. By Michael Bar-Zohar and Eitan Haber. Includes black-and-white photographic plates which include Yasser Arafat, together with an index.
- Dr. Michael Bar-Zohar and Eitan Haber (1983) Massacre in Munich The Lyons Press, ISBN 1-59228-945-2
- Hitler's Jewish Spy: The Most Extraordinary True Spy Story of World War II Sidgwick & Jackson (1985) ISBN 0-283-99293-X ISBN 978-0283992933. The biography of Paul Ernst Fackenheim
- Brothers (1993)
- Bitter Scent: The Case of L'Oreal, Nazis, and the Arab Boycott (1996) ISBN 978-0-525-94068-5
- Shimon Peres The Biography (2006) ISBN 978-1-4000-6292-8
- Mossad: The Great Operations (2010, with Nissim Mishal)
