= Leopold Gleim =

German SS officer

Leopold Gleim was a Colonel and SS Standartenführer in Warsaw during the Second World War.

He was for a time head of the Gestapo Department for Jewish Affairs in Poland. After the war, he converted to Islam, taking the name of Ali al-Nahar, and served with the Egyptian state services.
