= Operation Greif =

World War II Nazi special-ops mission

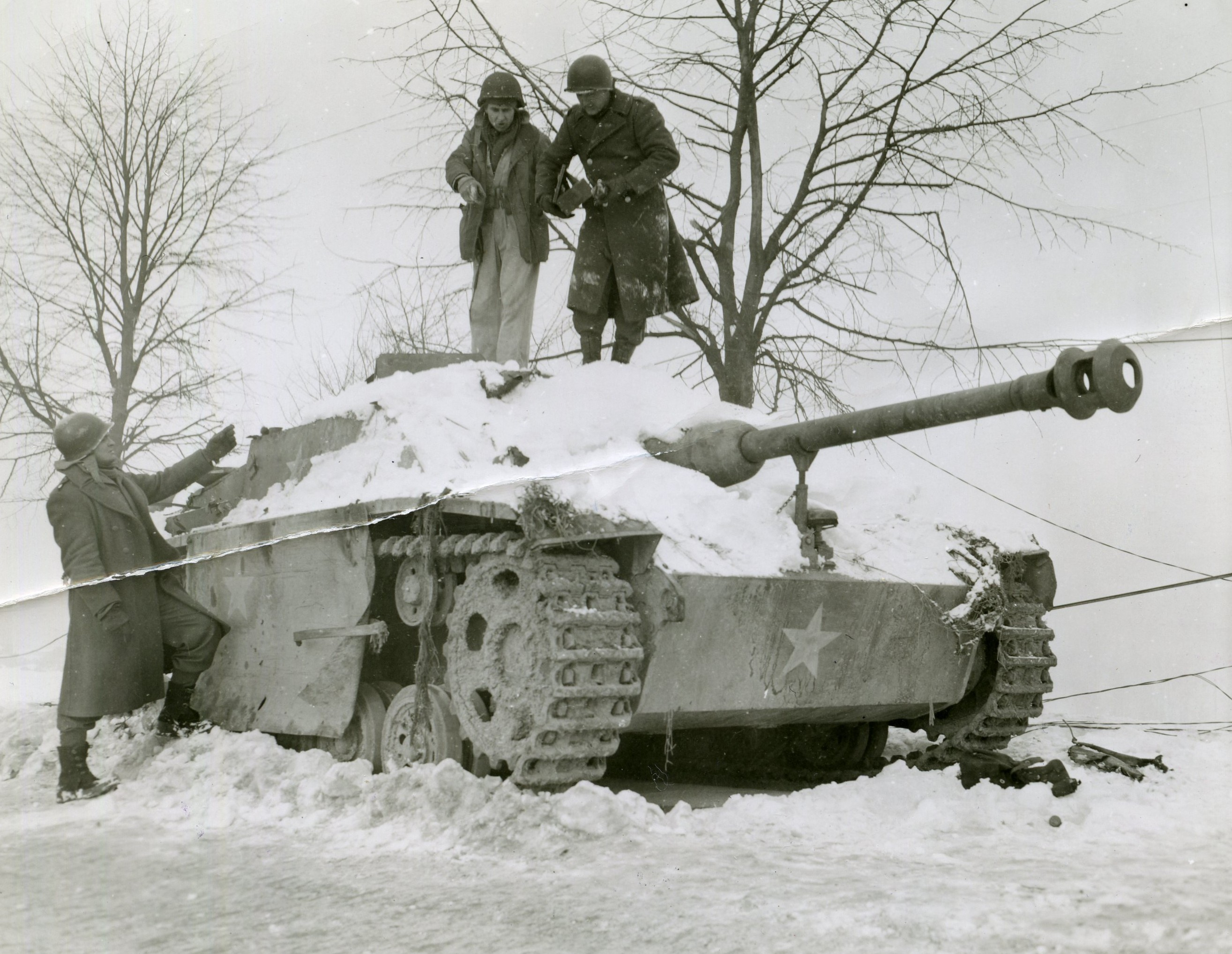
- An abandoned Sturmgeschütz III disguised with US Army markings
- Planned by: Waffen-SS
- Objective: Capture bridges over the Meuse River

Operation Greif (English: Griffin; German: Unternehmen Greif) was a special operation commanded by Waffen-SS commando Otto Skorzeny during the Battle of the Bulge in World War II. The operation was the brainchild of Adolf Hitler, and its purpose was to capture one or more of the bridges over the Meuse River before they could be destroyed. German soldiers, wearing captured British and U.S. Army uniforms and using captured Allied vehicles, were to cause confusion in the rear of the Allied lines.

A lack of vehicles, uniforms, and equipment limited the operation and it never achieved its original aim of securing the Meuse bridges. Skorzeny's post-war trial set a precedent clarifying article 4 of the Geneva Convention: as the German soldiers removed the Allied uniforms before engaging in combat, they were not to be considered francs-tireurs. There was an earlier Nazi military operation that used this name, namely an anti-partisan operation conducted by the German Army, begun on 14 August 1942, in the vicinity of Orsha and Vitebsk in the Soviet Union.

== Background ==
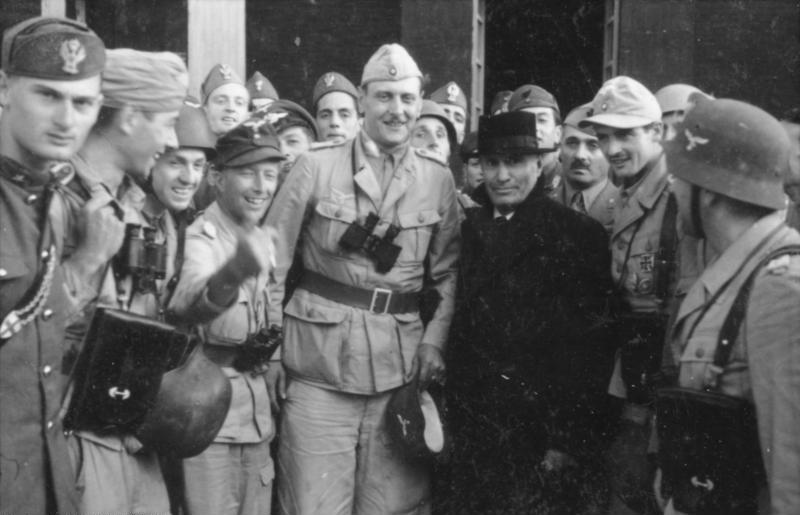
Skorzeny with the liberated Mussolini

Skorzeny had become one of Hitler's favorites following the success of Operation Panzerfaust in which he had supervised the kidnapping of Miklós Horthy, Jr., the son of Hungary's Regent, Admiral Miklós Horthy, to force Horthy's resignation. Following his return to Germany, Skorzeny was summoned to meet Hitler at his headquarters at Rastenburg in East Prussia on 22 October 1944. After congratulating Skorzeny, Hitler outlined the planned Ardennes Offensive and the role he was to play in it. Hitler informed Skorzeny that the Americans had used 3 captured German tanks with German markings in the Battle of Aachen. For this reason, he asked him to set up a similar unit.

Skorzeny was to form a special brigade, Panzer Brigade 150, whose purpose would be to capture one or more of the bridges over the Meuse River before they could be destroyed. Hitler informed him that he had decided that this could be accomplished more quickly and with fewer losses if Skorzeny and his men wore U.S. uniforms. Hitler also remarked that small units disguised in enemy uniforms could cause great confusion among the enemy by giving false orders, upsetting communications, and misdirecting troops.

I want you to command a group of American and British troops and get them across the Meuse and seize one of the bridges. Not, my dear Skorzeny, real Americans or British. I want you to create special units wearing American and British uniforms. They will travel in captured Allied tanks. Think of the confusion you could cause! I envisage a whole string of false orders which will upset communications and attack morale.

Skorzeny was well aware that under the Hague Convention of 1907, any of his men captured while wearing U.S. uniforms could be executed as spies and this possibility caused much discussion with Generaloberst Jodl and Field Marshal von Rundstedt.

=== Panzer Brigade 150 ===
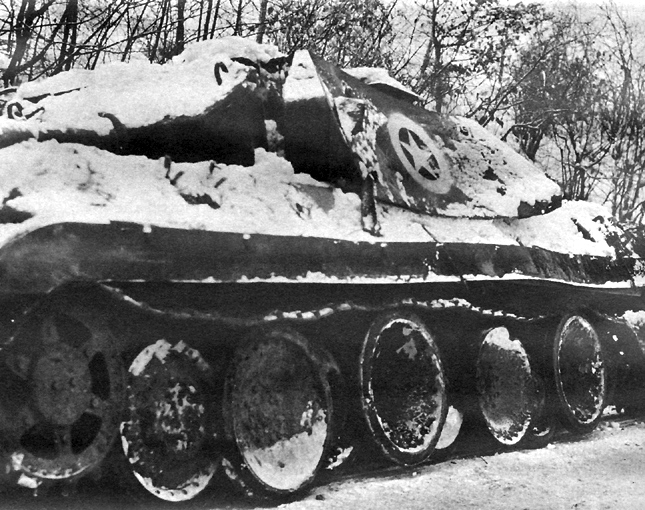
Knocked-out Panther tank disguised as an M10 tank destroyer

The timing of the Ardennes Offensive meant that Skorzeny had only five or six weeks to recruit and train a brand new unit for what Hitler named Operation Greif. Within four days he sent his plans for Panzer Brigade 150 to Jodl. Despite asking for 3,300 men he was given an immediate go-ahead and promised full support. The Oberkommando der Wehrmacht issued an order on 25 October requesting suitable soldiers for the operation with "knowledge of the English language and also the American dialect" which was passed on to every headquarters on the Western Front, and this request soon became known to the Allies.

The new brigade needed U.S. Army vehicles, weapons and uniforms; OB West was asked to find 15 tanks, 20 armored cars, 20 self-propelled guns, 100 jeeps, 40 motorcycles, 120 trucks, and British and U.S. Army uniforms all to be delivered to the brigade's training camp which had been set up at Grafenwöhr in eastern Bavaria. The equipment delivered fell short of the requirements, including only two Sherman tanks in poor condition, and Skorzeny had to use German substitutes, five tanks (Panzer V "Panther") and six armored cars. The brigade was also flooded by Polish and Russian equipment sent by units who had no idea what the request was for. To make matters worse, Skorzeny had only 10 men who spoke perfect English and had some knowledge of U.S. idioms, 30–40 more spoke English well but had no knowledge of slang, and 120–150 who spoke English moderately well, but the majority of his men spoke little to no English.

Faced with these setbacks, Skorzeny scaled down Panzer Brigade 150 from three battalions to two and assembled the 150 best English speakers into a commando unit named Einheit Stielau. Skorzeny also recruited a company of SS-Jagdverbände "Mitte" and two companies from SS-Fallschirmjäger-Abteilung 600, and was given two Luftwaffe parachute battalions formerly of KG 200, tank crews from Panzer regiments, and gunners from artillery units. A total of 2,500 men were eventually assembled at Grafenwöhr, 800 fewer than had been hoped.

The final total of equipment assembled was also less than had been hoped; only enough U.S. Army weapons had been found to equip the commando unit, and only four U.S. Army scout cars, 30 jeeps, and 15 trucks were found, the difference being made up with German vehicles painted in U.S. olive drab with Allied markings applied. Only a single Sherman tank was available, and the brigade's Panther tanks were disguised as M10 tank destroyers by removing their cupolas and disguising their hulls and turrets with thin sheet metal. The problem of recognition by their own forces was crucial, and they were to identify themselves by various methods: displaying a small yellow triangle at the rear of their vehicles; tanks keeping their guns pointing in the nine o'clock position; troops wearing pink or blue scarves and removing their helmets; and flashes from a blue or red torch at night.

As the brigade prepared for action, rumors began to fly that they were to relieve the besieged towns of Dunkirk or Lorient, capture Antwerp, or to capture the Allied Supreme Command at SHAEF at Paris. It was not until 10 December that Skorzeny's own commanders were made aware of the brigade's true plans. Panzerbrigade 150 was to attempt to capture at least two of the bridges over the Meuse River at Amay, Huy, and Andenne before they could be destroyed, the troops to begin their operation when the Panzer advance reached the High Fens, between the Ardennes and the Eifel highlands. The three groups (Kampfgruppe X, Kampfgruppe Y, and Kampfgruppe Z) would then move towards the separate bridges.

=== Einheit Stielau mission ===
The Einheit Stielau commando unit had been assembled from the brigade's best English speakers, but few of them had much if any experience of undercover operations or sabotage. There was little time to train them properly, but they were given short courses in demolition and radio skills, studied the organization of the U.S. Army and its badges of rank and drill, and some were even sent to POW camps at Küstrin and Limburg to refresh their language skills through contact with U.S. POWs. Dressed in U.S. Army uniforms (the highest U.S. Army rank used was that of colonel), armed with U.S. Army weapons, and using U.S. Army jeeps, the commandos were given three missions:

1. Demolition squads of five or six men were to destroy bridges, ammunition dumps, and fuel stores.
2. Reconnaissance patrols of three or four men were to reconnoiter on both sides of the Meuse River and also pass on bogus orders to any U.S. units they met, reverse road signs, remove minefield warnings, and cordon off roads with warnings of nonexistent mines.
3. "Lead" commando units would work closely with the attacking units to disrupt the U.S. chain of command by destroying field telephone wires and radio stations, and issuing false orders.

== Action ==
On 14 December, Panzerbrigade 150 was assembled near Bad Münstereifel and on the afternoon of 16 December it moved out, advancing behind the three attacking Panzer divisions, the 1st SS Panzer Division, the 12th SS Panzer Division, and the 12th Volksgrenadier Division, with the aim of moving around them when they reached the High Fens. However, when the 1st SS Panzer Division failed to reach the start point within two days, Skorzeny realized that Operation Greif's initial aims were now doomed.

On 17 December, as a consequence, Skorzeny attended a staff conference at the 6th Panzer Army's HQ, and suggested that his brigade be used as a normal army unit. This was agreed to, and he was ordered to assemble south of Malmedy and report to the 1st SS Panzer Division's HQ in Ligneuville. On 21 December 1944 this brigade, under Skorzeny's command tried to take Malmedy. Several assaults of the Skorzeny brigade were eventually successfully repelled by the U.S. defenders. This would constitute the only noticeable attempt from the Germans to take Malmedy during the Battle of the Bulge.

=== Commandos ===
Battle of the Bulge, Meuse River at the lower left

Skorzeny described the activities of the Einheit Stielau in an interview with the U.S. Army in August 1945 following his surrender. According to him, four units of reconnaissance commandos and two units of demolition commandos were sent out during the first few days of the attack, and three units went with the 1st SS Panzer Division, 12th SS Panzer Division, and 12th Volksgrenadier Division, with another three units accompanying Panzerbrigade 150's three groups. Skorzeny reported that one commando team entered Malmedy on 16 December, and another team managed to persuade a U.S. Army unit to withdraw from Poteau, Belgium, the same day. Another team switched around road signs and sent an entire U.S. regiment in the wrong direction.

As a result, U.S. troops began asking other soldiers questions that they felt only Americans would know the answers to in order to flush out the German infiltrators, which included naming state capitals, sports and trivia questions related to the U.S., etc. This practice resulted in Brigadier General Bruce C. Clarke being held at gunpoint for some time after he incorrectly said the Chicago Cubs were in the American League and a captain spending a week in detention after he was caught wearing German boots. General Omar Bradley was repeatedly stopped in his staff car by checkpoint guards who seemed to enjoy asking him such questions. The Skorzeny commando paranoia also contributed to numerous instances of mistaken identity. All over the Ardennes, U.S. soldiers attempted to persuade suspicious U.S. military policemen that they were genuine GIs. On 20 December, two American soldiers were killed by a nervous military policeman.

Two more American soldiers were killed and several wounded as late as 2 January 1945 when an armor task force from the U.S. 6th Armored Division moving into the Wardin area of Bastogne opened fire on the U.S. 35th Infantry Division in a case of mistaken identity. According to Paul Fussell, an uncorrected typographical error on U.S. identity cards could serve as a tell: the top of a genuine card read "Not a pass. For indentification [sic] purposes only." Fussell suggests that a German preparing the disguises of the commandos could not resist correcting the spelling on their false cards to read "identification". Fussell does not cite a particular example.

In all, 44 German soldiers wearing U.S. uniforms were sent through U.S. lines, and all but eight returned, with the last men being sent through the lines on 19 December; after this, the element of surprise had been lost and they reverted to wearing German uniforms. It was not an uncommon practice at the time to send camouflaged reconnaissance units behind enemy lines, but because of the impact of Operation Greif, every occurrence of this was attributed to Skorzeny's men. In addition, German infantry often salvaged any items of U.S. Army clothing they found, thus it was not out of the question that regular German troops might be killed or captured wearing items of U.S. uniforms.

=== Eisenhower rumor ===
So great was the confusion caused by Operation Greif that the U.S. Army "saw spies and saboteurs everywhere". Perhaps the largest panic was created when a German commando team was captured near Aywaille on 17 December. Comprising Unteroffizier Manfred Pernass, Oberfähnrich Günther Billing, and Gefreiter Wilhelm Schmidt, they were captured when they failed to give the correct password. It was Schmidt who gave credence to a rumor that Skorzeny intended to capture General Dwight Eisenhower and his staff. A document outlining Operation Greif's elements of deception (though not its objectives) had earlier been captured by the U.S. 106th Infantry Division near Heckhuscheid, and because Skorzeny was already well known for rescuing Italian dictator Benito Mussolini (Operation Oak) and Operation Panzerfaust, the Americans readily believed this story. Eisenhower was reportedly "unamused" by having to spend Christmas 1944 isolated for security reasons. After several days of confinement, he left his office, angrily declaring he had to get out and that he didn't care if anyone tried to kill him.

== Aftermath ==
Pernass, Billing, and Schmidt were given a military trial at Henri-Chapelle on 21 December and were sentenced to death; they were executed by a firing squad on 23 December. Three more Germans were also tried on 23 December and shot at Henri-Chapelle on 26 December, seven more men were tried on 26 December and executed at Henri-Chapelle on 30 December, and three others were tried on 31 December and executed at Huy on 13 January 1945. These executions were carried out by the U.S. First Army. All of these commissions were appointed by Lieutenant General Courtney Hodges, commanding general of the U.S. First Army pursuant to authority delegated to him by General Omar Bradley, Commanding General of the Twelfth U.S. Army Group on the instructions of General Dwight Eisenhower, commanding the European Theater of Operations, United States Army. The team's leader of Operation Greif, Günther Schulz, was tried by a military commission sometime in May 1945 and executed near the German city of Braunschweig on 14 June. It is not known why his trial was delayed until May 1945, and it is unclear who ordered his death sentence to be carried out. His execution was carried out by the U.S. Ninth Army.

After World War II, Skorzeny was tried as a war criminal at the Dachau Trials in 1947 for allegedly violating the laws of war during the Battle of the Bulge. He and nine officers of the Panzerbrigade 150 were charged with improperly using U.S. uniforms "by entering into combat disguised therewith and treacherously firing upon and killing members of the armed forces of the United States". They were also charged with participation in wrongfully obtaining U.S. uniforms and Red Cross parcels consigned to U.S. prisoners of war from a prisoner-of-war camp. Acquitting all defendants, the military tribunal drew a distinction between using enemy uniforms during combat and for other purposes including deception; it could not be shown that Skorzeny had actually given any orders to fight in U.S. uniforms. Skorzeny said that he was told by German legal experts that as long as he did not order his men to fight in combat while wearing U.S. uniforms, such a tactic was a legitimate ruse of war. A surprise defense witness was F. F. E. Yeo-Thomas, a former Allied SOE agent, who testified that he and his operatives wore German uniforms behind enemy lines.

== See also ==
- Commando Order of 1942 by Hitler
- Gleiwitz incident of 1939
- Shibboleth, the practice of using pronunciation or cultural knowledge to differentiate friends from military enemies
