= Tito Escort Battalion =

Yugoslav Partisan military unit

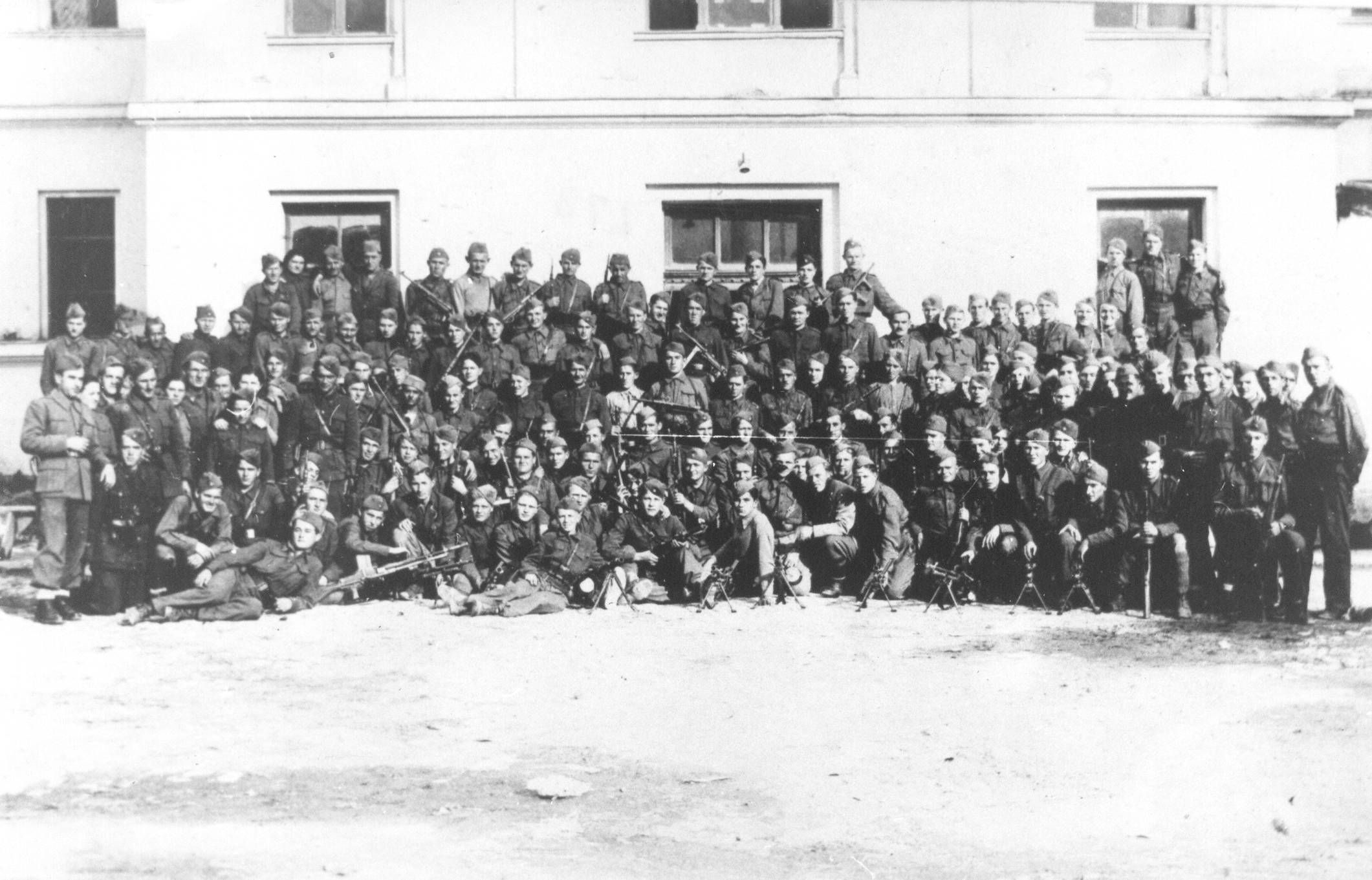
- The Tito Escort Battalion in Valjevo, October 1944.
- Active: 1941–1945
- Allegiance: Yugoslav Partisans
- Type: Infantry
- Role: Protection of the Supreme Headquarters personnel
- Size: Battalion
- Engagements: Third Enemy Offensive; Partisan Long March; Operation Weiss; Operation Schwarz; Operation Rösselsprung

The Tito Escort Battalion was the protection unit of the Supreme Headquarters of Yugoslav Partisans and their commander Josip Broz Tito, responsible for their safety during World War II in Yugoslavia. It accompanied Tito throughout Yugoslavia during the war, suffering significant casualties and fighting pitched battles at times. Its most notable engagements were during the Axis Operation Schwarz offensive in south–eastern Bosnia in mid–1943, and in holding off the airborne assault of the German 500th SS Parachute Battalion during Operation Rösselsprung in mid–1944.
