= Panzer Brigade 150 =

German special operations unit of World War Two

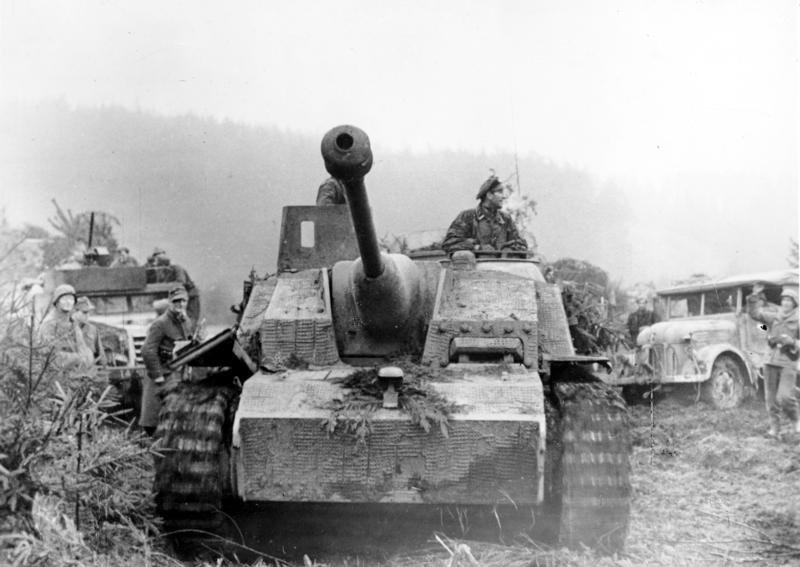
- Sturmgeschütz with American M3 Half-track in background
- Active: 1944 – 1945
- Country: Nazi Germany
- Branch: Waffen-SS
- Type: Panzer; Special operations forces
- Role: Armoured warfare Maneuver warfare Raiding
- Size: Brigade
- Part of: 6th Panzer Army
- Engagements: World War II: Battle of the Bulge

Commanders
- Notable commanders: Otto Skorzeny

Panzer Brigade 150 or SS Panzer Brigade 150 (German: 150. SS-Panzer-Brigade) was a formation of the German Army during World War II that was formed to take part in the Ardennes offensive. It was tasked with the capture of the bridges at Amay, Engis and Huy. The Brigade is known for including English-speaking members wearing American Army uniforms to cause disruption and disinformation behind the American lines. The Brigade was also issued captured Allied equipment and had two Sherman tanks (which never saw action due to mechanical problems) and German vehicles were modified to resemble Allied armoured vehicles.

== Operation Greif ==
The German code name for this unit's role in the Ardennes offensive was Unternehmen Greif (Operation Greif). The timing of the offensive meant that the Brigade Commander Otto Skorzeny had only 5 or 6 weeks to recruit and train a brand new unit. Within four days he sent his plans for 150 Panzerbrigade to General Alfred Jodl. Despite asking for 3,300 men he was given an immediate go-ahead and promised full support. The Oberkommando der Wehrmacht issued an order on 25 October requesting suitable soldiers for the operation with "knowledge of the English language and also the American dialect" which was passed on to every headquarters on the Western Front, and this request soon became known to the Allies.

The new brigade needed US Army vehicles, weapons and uniforms; OB West was asked to find 15 tanks, 20 armoured cars, 20 self-propelled guns, 100 Jeeps, 40 motorcycles, 120 trucks, and British and US Army uniforms all to be delivered to the brigade's training camp which had been set up at Grafenwöhr in eastern Bavaria. The equipment delivered fell short of the requirements, including only two Sherman tanks in poor condition, and Skorzeny had to use German substitutes, 5 Panther tanks, 5 StuG IIIs and 6 armoured cars. The brigade was also flooded by Polish and Russian equipment sent by units who had no idea what the request was for. As far as English-speaking soldiers went, only 10 men who spoke perfect English and had some knowledge of American idiom were found, 30-40 men who spoke English well but had no knowledge of slang, 120-150 who spoke English moderately well, and 200 or so who had learned English at school.

Faced with these setbacks, Skorzeny scaled down Panzer Brigade 150 from three battalions to two and assembled the 150 best English speakers into a commando unit named Einheit Stielau. Skorzeny also recruited a company of SS-Jagdverbände "Mitte" and two companies from SS-Fallschirmjäger-Battalion 600, and was given two Luftwaffe parachute battalions formerly of KG 200, tank crews from Panzer regiments, and gunners from artillery units. A total of 2,500 men were eventually assembled at Grafenwöhr, 800 less than had been hoped.

The final total of equipment assembled was also less than had been hoped; only enough US Army weapons had been found to equip the commando unit, and only 4 US Army scout cars, 30 Jeeps, and 15 trucks were found, the difference being made up with German vehicles painted in US olive drab with Allied markings applied. Only a single Sherman tank was available, and the brigade's five Panther tanks were disguised as M10 tank destroyers by removing their cupolas and disguising their hulls and turrets with thin sheet metal. The problem of recognition by their own forces was crucial, and they were to identify themselves by various methods: displaying a small yellow triangle at the rear of their vehicles; tanks keeping their guns pointing in the nine o' clock position; troops wearing pink or blue scarves and removing their helmets; and flashes from a blue or red torch at night.

As the brigade prepared for action, rumours began to fly that they were to relieve the besieged towns of Dunkirk or Lorient, capture Antwerp, or to capture the Allied Supreme Command at SHAEF at Paris. It was not until 10 December that Skorzeny's own commanders were made aware of the brigade's true plans. Panzer Brigade 150 was to attempt to capture at least two of the bridges over the Meuse river at Amay, Huy, and Andenne before they could be destroyed, the troops to begin their operation when the Panzer advance reached the Hohes Venn, between the Ardennes and the Eifel highlands. The three groups (Kampfgruppe X, Kampfgruppe Y, and Kampfgruppe Z) would then move towards the separate bridges.

When Unternehmen Greif started, the brigade was held up in the massive traffic jams which caused major problems to the entire offensive. After losing two days this way, the original goals of the brigade was more or less given up and it was to fight as a regular formation.

It was given the task of capturing Malmedy, but a deserter warned the US forces of the plans. The attack was met with heavy fire and the Germans were forced to retreat. The US artillery took a heavy toll on the unit even when it was withdrawn from the actual fighting, the wounded included Otto Skorzeny himself who was hit by shrapnel.

== Aftermath ==
The brigade was finally withdrawn from the front lines on 28 Dec, being replaced by 18th Volksgrenadier Division. 44 German soldiers wearing U.S. uniforms managed to slip through U.S. lines and all but 8 returned alive. Another 23 of its men were captured and 17 were executed as spies.

After World War II, Skorzeny was tried as a war criminal at the Dachau Trials in 1947 for allegedly violating the laws of war during the Battle of the Bulge. He and nine officers of the Panzerbrigade 150 were charged with improperly using American uniforms by entering into combat disguised therewith and treacherously firing upon and killing members of the United States Armed Forces. They were also charged with participation in wrongfully obtaining U.S. uniforms and Red Cross parcels consigned to American prisoners of war from a prisoner-of-war camp. Acquitting all defendants, the military tribunal drew a distinction between using enemy uniforms during combat and for other purposes including deception; it could not be shown that Skorzeny had actually given any orders to fight in U.S. uniforms. Skorzeny said that he was told by German legal experts that as long he doesn't order his men to fight in combat while wearing U.S. uniforms, such a tactic was a legitimate ruse of war. A surprise defense witness was F. F. E. Yeo-Thomas, a former Allied SOE agent, who testified that he and his operatives wore German uniforms behind enemy lines.

== Commanders ==
- Oberstleutnant Hermann Wulf (1944 – 14 December 1944)
- SS-Obersturmbannführer Otto Skorzeny, (14 December 1944 – January 1945)
