= Paul Ernst Fackenheim =

German Jewish Army lieutenant

Paul Ernst Fackenheim (born February 8, 1892, in Frankfurt am Main) was a German Jewish Army lieutenant who fought in World War I and received the Iron Cross 1st and 2nd class.

In 1939 he was detained and transferred to Dachau concentration camp; he was prisoner number 26336.

In 1941 Fackenheim was recruited by the Abwehr to serve as a spy; the German Military Intelligence Service appealed to his officer's sense of honour to serve his country once again as a spy in Palestine. His job as a spy in the Middle East lasted only a few days; he was detained and interrogated by the British, who kept him in captivity until 1946.

He survived the war as one of the few Jews to be freed from a concentration camp by the German authorities and returned to Germany, settling in Henstedt-Ulzburg.

Michael Bar-Zohar wrote his biography, titled in English "Hitler's Jewish Spy" ISBN 0-283-99293-X ISBN 978-0-283-99293-3
