= Gelatine (airship) =

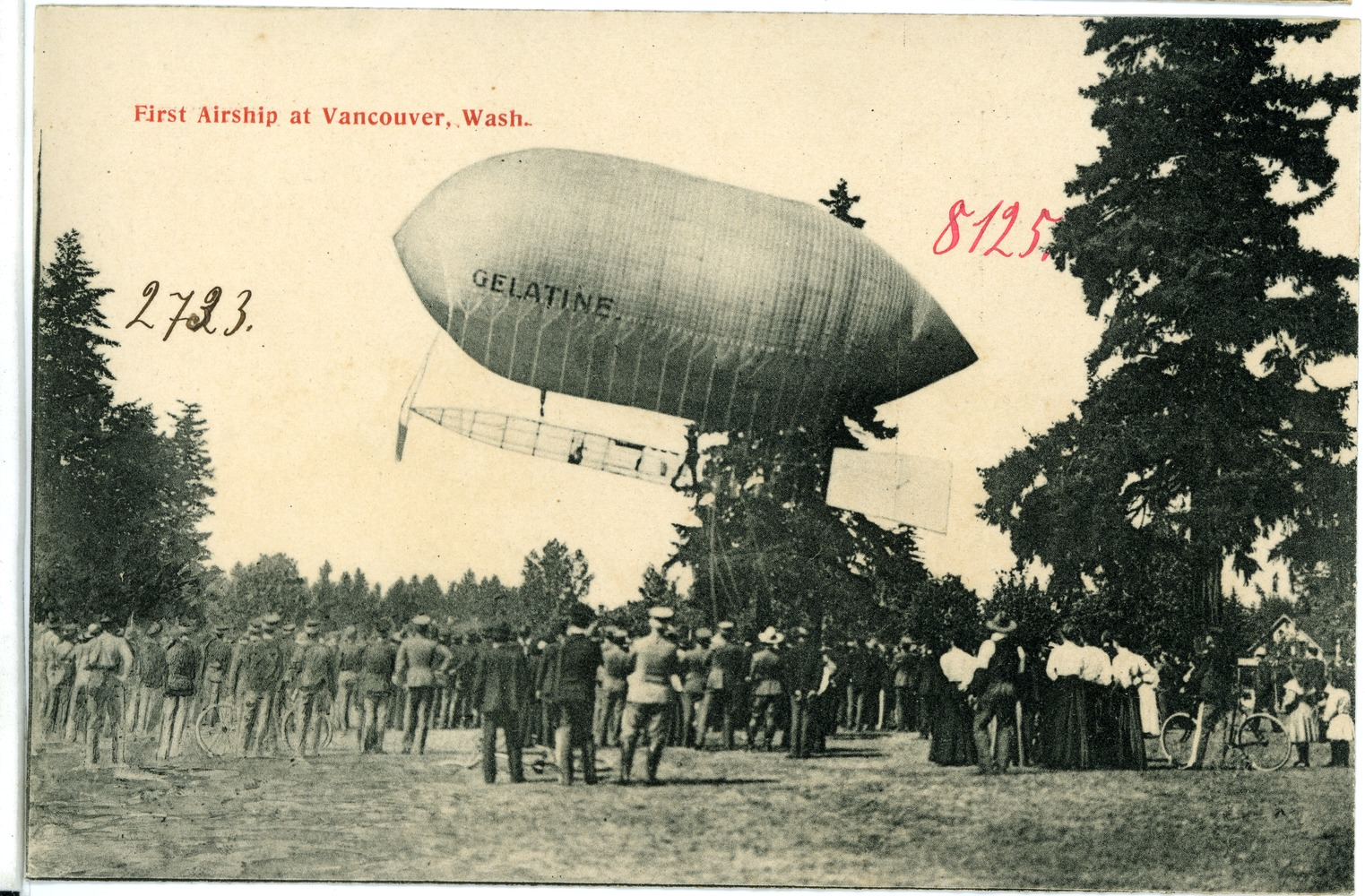
Gelatine (1906)

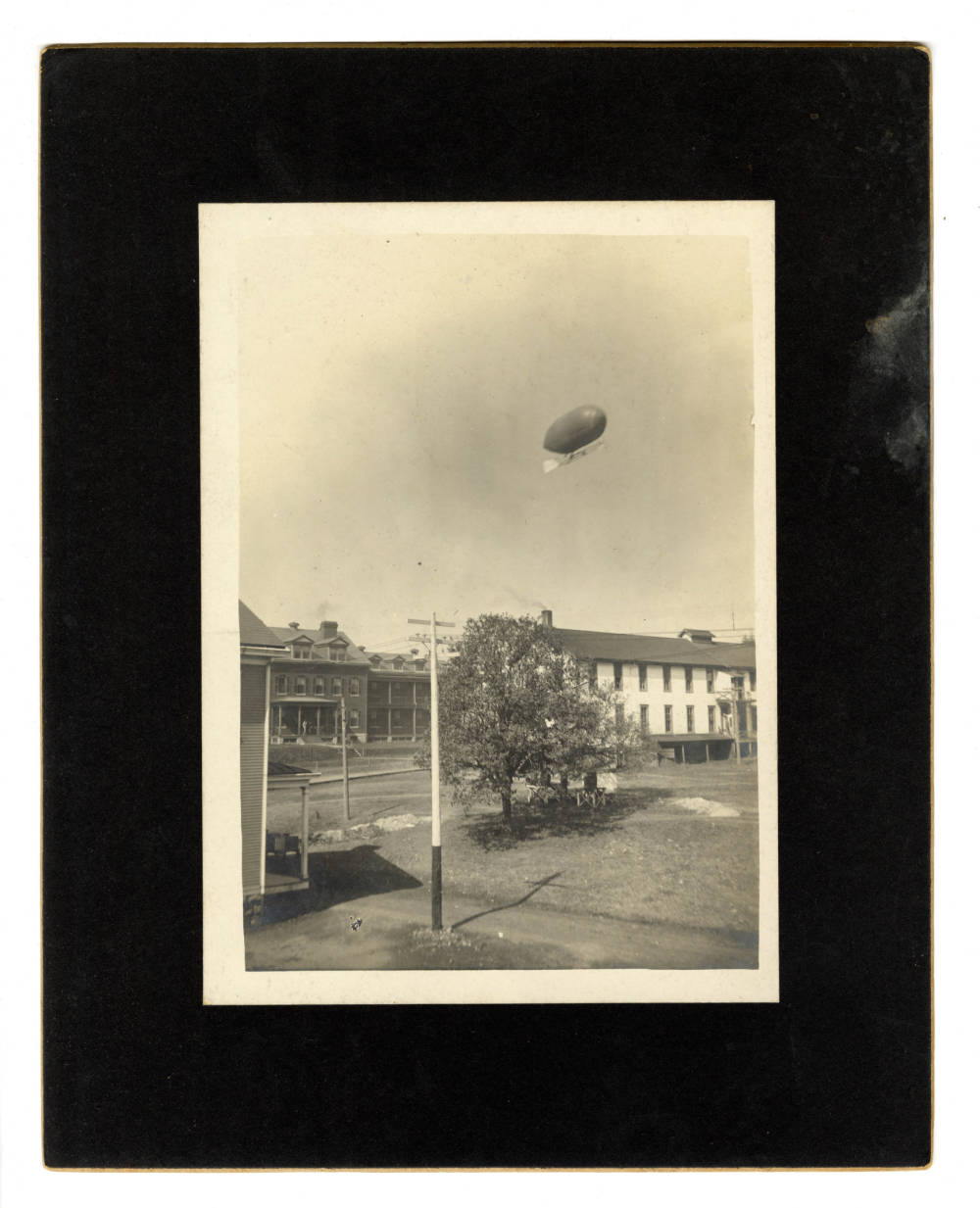
Airship Gelatine flying

Gelatine was an airship operated by the United States Army Signal Corps. Gelatine was built by Thomas Scott Baldwin's company Baldwin's Airships, Balloons, Aeroplanes of New York City. On the morning of September 19, 1905, the Gelatine, piloted by Lincoln J. Beachey, ascended from the grounds of the Lewis and Clark Centennial Exposition on the shores of Guild's Lake in Portland, Oregon, landing 40 minutes later at the Vancouver Barracks in Vancouver, Washington. The flight is considered as the first aerial crossing of the Columbia River and the first account of controlled powered flight in Washington.
