= George Otten =

German-born American horticulturist, florist, and landscape architect (1861–1954)

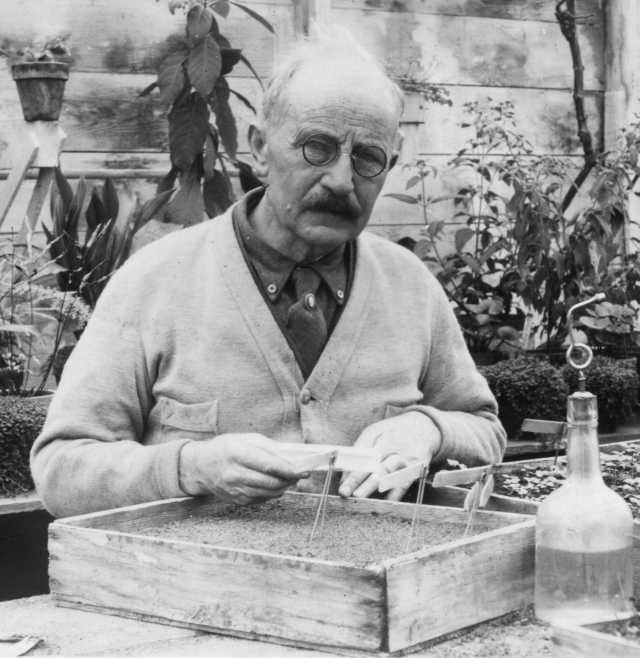
- Otten in 1929
- Born: Johann Friedrich Georg Otten c. 1861; Bremen, Germany
- Died: February 18, 1954 (aged 92–93); Seaside, Oregon, U.S.
- Occupations: Horticulturist; florist; landscape architect; landscape gardener
- Known for: Horticulture, olive propagation in California, Portland's rose culture, and begonia cultivation
- Notable work: Tuberous-rooted Begonias and their Culture (1935)
- Children: George

Johann Friedrich Georg Otten (c. 1861 – February 18, 1954), known professionally as George Otten, was a German-born American horticulturist, florist, landscape architect, and landscape gardener whose significant contributions in Portland and Seaside, Oregon, established him as an influential figure in the state's floral and civic beautification heritage.

Otten contributed to Portland's reputation as the “Rose City” through his leadership in landmark events like the Lewis and Clark Centennial Exposition, Portland's Rose Day, the First Annual Fall Flower Show, and the Portland Rose Festival—where he was credited as "the originator of Portland's Rose Festival" by The Oregon Sunday Journal on June 7, 1914—and his influential roles in civic committees and public education. An recognized authority on tuberous begonias, Otten's career spanned from 1885 to 1954, leaving an enduring influence in Oregon's gardens, parks, and global horticulture.

== Early life, education, and immigration to the United States ==
Johann Friedrich Georg Otten was born in 1861 in Bremen, Germany, where his passion for horticulture took root. At age 15, around 1876, he began an apprenticeship in horticulture, mastering foundational skills at Lehe, Germany. After graduation, at 18—circa 1879—he undertook a walking tour from the North Sea to the Adriatic Sea, studying Europe's great gardens and refining his landscaping and horticultural expertise. According to Otten's obituary, "At one time he was in charge of the royal botanical gardens of King Ludwig in Germany."

=== Olive propagation in California ===
In 1884, at age 23, Otten immigrated to the United States. Otten arrived in San Francisco, California and begun work on olive propagation using the techniques he learned from his time studying olives in the Adriatic Sea region. According to his 1954 obituary, he "was credited with revolutionizing horticulture in olive groves of California". He also improved methods of making olive tree cuttings in California, and most of the 60,000 trees planted there in the early days came from his cuttings.

=== Arrival in Oregon ===
A year later in 1885 Otten traveled north to settle in Portland, Oregon, launching a career as a landscape gardener and florist. He established a flower shop at NW 23rd Avenue and Burnside, along with a greenhouse at the same location, quickly integrating into the city's floral scene.

=== Armory Charity Ball ===
By April 25, 1900, Otten had decorated the Charity Ball at the Armory, dubbed the "Event of the Season," with floral arrangements, showcasing his early aesthetic influence.

=== Children's Flower Growing Contest ===
On November 30, 1902, Otten's "indefatigable efforts" alongside President McCusker, spending much time and labor, drove the success of a children's flower-growing contest sponsored by The Sunday Oregonian, fostering Portland's gardening culture among the youth.

=== Civic engagement and public education ===
Otten played an important role in shaping park design standards, emphasizing local expertise. On April 7, 1902, The Morning Oregonian noted his advocacy for local landscape artists to design city parks, setting standards for how park designers should be chosen and opposing the hiring of an East Coast park expert, as he argued in The Morning Oregonian that local talent, familiar with regional climate and topography, should submit designs, ensuring the best plans were accepted. His efforts cultivated a horticultural ethos that persisted in Portland's development, influencing park beautification and the integration of flowers into public spaces.

Otten's influence deepened through civic roles and public education. On February 21, 1904, he authored an article in The Sunday Oregonian titled “A Practical Florist Makes a Plea for Flowers,” advocating for beautifying Portland gardens with annuals to enhance the city's floral landscape, demonstrating his commitment to public horticultural education. On March 12, 1905, The Oregonian identified him on the Committee on Parks, Trees and Shrubs of the Chamber of Commerce's Improvement Board, advocating for citywide flower and tree planting, shaping Portland's garden focus.

=== Role in the Lewis and Clark Exposition ===
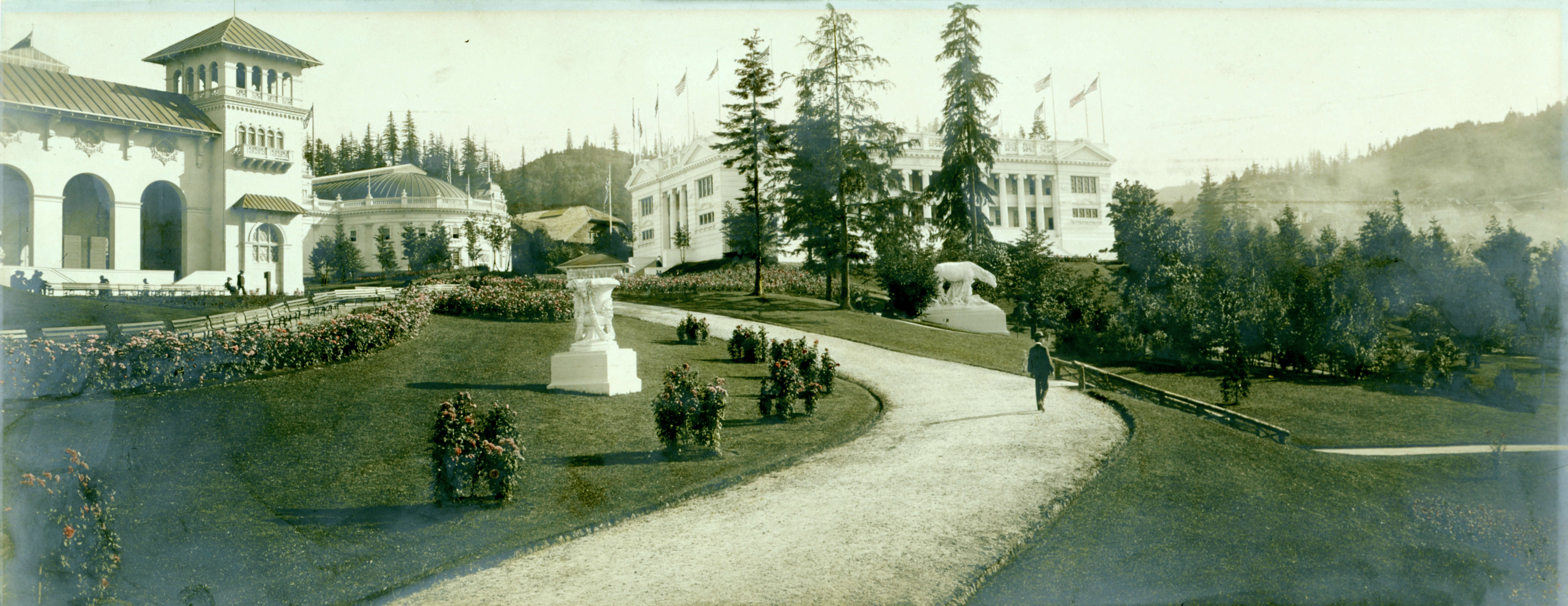
Footpath by roses, Lewis and Clark Centennial Exposition, Portland, Oregon, 1905

Otten was a key figure in the 1905 Lewis and Clark Exposition, particularly its "Many Acres Of Roses" exhibit, an unprecedented endeavor. On May 1, 1902, he addressed the Portland Rose Society, presenting on “Floral Culture” and demonstrating budding and grafting techniques, urging immediate preparation for the Lewis and Clark Exposition's rose exhibit. This guidance shaped the exposition's floral focus. As a member of the Committee on Floriculture, reported in The Sunday Oregonian on February 22, 1903, he pushed for a memorable Exposition. He said to the committee "We want to get the American Association of Florists here in 1905 and should have something to show them. Our plan of a lawn of roses is something new and will attract the eye of anyone. King Ludwig of Bavaria once had a solid plat of roses about the size of this room and that was considered a wonder. So far as I know there has never been anything before of the kind we plan, and the sight of a solid mass of flowering roses, ten acres of so, would make anyone remember the Exposition."

During the technical discussion, Otten proposed importing high grade slips to be grafted onto wild rose stalks. He said this "would put the plants a year ahead and would give strong, vigorous rose bushes." He offered to transplant all roses in June 1903 with targets of 750 standards and over 15,000 grafted bushes. A new committee was then formed to "handle the business of the Exposition," and Otten was appointed to it.

By December 24, 1905, The Oregon Sunday Journal credited him with laying out 5,000 rose bushes on the fairgrounds and for suggesting rare plants, including roses, be transplanted to the City Park for preservation, influencing park enhancements.

The success of the 1905 rose exhibits directly contributed to the creation of the Portland International Rose Test Garden, established in 1917 in Washington Park (at a higher elevation than where the Exposition's rose displays were located). This exhibit also inspired the Portland Rose Festival.

== Works in America ==
=== Portland's Rose Day ===
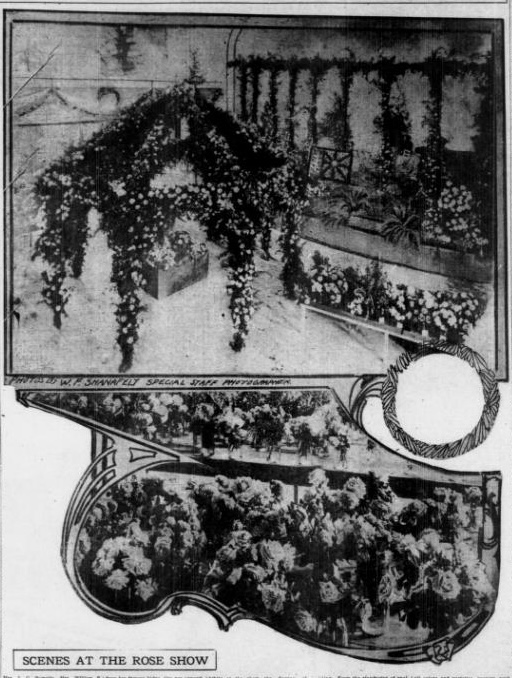
Scenes At The Rose Show, flower decorations by George Otten.

Otten played a key role in Portland's Rose Day on June 3, 1905, organized by the Portland Rose Society. The Oregon Sunday Journal on May 28 reported that "Rose day at the fair will be one of the special days scheduled for the [Lewis and Clark] exposition season..."

The Oregon Sunday Journal also reported that "Otten has prepared a plan for the display of roses, and also for decorating the room in the Auditorium where the display will be held. This plan is a most excellent one, and is of great credit to Mr. Otten, but roses must be furnished to carry out this plan. He will have charge of the decorations and will be assisted by members of the Portland Rose society and employees of the exposition. This plan cannot be carried out unless the roses are contributed gratuitously and generously by the people of Portland." The roses were supplied by thousands of Portland's residents.

"George Otten in charge of the decorating of the big building, had ample opportunity to give vent to his artistic temperament, and the result of his work showed that he did so. In the center of the hall stood an immense open arbor of circular shape, built entirely of roses and feathery greens. This could be entered from any side and was rarely effective."

"To hide the big stage which is built in one end of the auditorium, Mr. Otten had erected the frame of an Italian pergola which he covered in smilax and roses. The columns of this rose fully 30 feet from the stage level, and its beauty was most impressive. Festoons of roses and greens draped the railing of the gallery which surrounds the entire hall, and the stairways were banked solidly with them. The immense columns which support the building were thickly twined, and the floor space occupied by innumerable long tables on which the exhibition roses were placed in glass jars. There were 24 amateur exhibitors and a number of professional, and in addition to these many rosarians displayed tables of perfect specimens which were not entered for competition."

In the professional florist competition, Otten received 3rd place for his display.

His efforts fostered civic pride, paving the way for the Rose Festival and reinforcing the Portland International Rose Test Garden's future.

=== City Park ===
In 1905 George Otten proposed transplanting "all rare plants and trees"—including roses—from around Portland to City Park—later renamed Washington Park—where they could grow and multiply. Otten shared this proposal with City Park park-keeper Mr. Herman Lowitz, who shared the same sentiment.

In December 1905, Lowitz shared with The Oregon Sunday Journal the conversation he had had with Otten and that concerns had risen regarding the planting of rose bushes along Portland's city sidewalks. Lowitz said that many had “grown up and spread out until they interfered with ordinary traffic” and that these widespread rose plantings, once considered an asset, were increasingly seen as a detriment. Mr. Lowitz also stated that City Park already had about 8,000 roses bushes planted. He also expressed that "A public park is a place for flowers, but on the public highways give me just a well-trimmed clean lawn." The need and justification for a formal city rose garden in City Park had become evident and plans were being formulated by Mr. Otten and Mr. Lowitz.

However, Mrs. Rose Hoyt—President of the Rose Society—did not agree with the idea of Mr. Otten and Mr. Lowitz to move the roses from around the city to the City Park. Mrs. Rose Hoyt advocated for more roses to be planted around the city. "How can we make Portland more beautiful?" "About the best we can do to improve the appearance of Portland is to urge more people to plant more bushes."

In 1917 City Park became the site of the future Portland International Rose Test Garden.

=== Founding the Portland Rose Festival ===
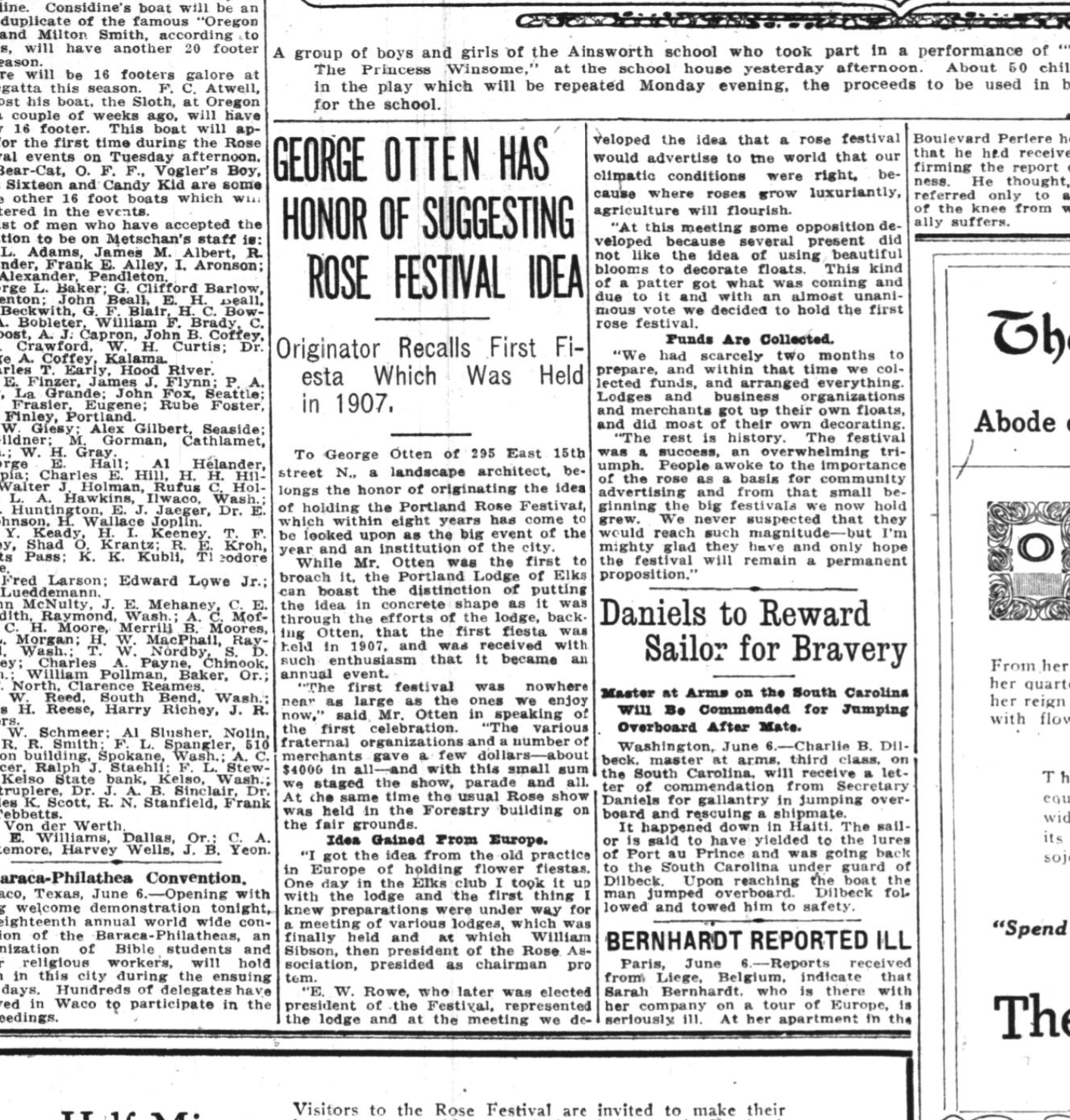
"Originator Recalls First Fiesta Which Was Held in 1907"

Otten's most notable contribution was founding the Portland Rose Festival. The Oregon Sunday Journal on June 7, 1914, explicitly named him "the originator of Portland's Rose Festival," stating, “To George Otten of 295 East 15th Street N., a landscape architect, belongs the honor of originating the idea.” The article further noted, “Mr. Otten was the first to broach it, the Portland Lodge of Elks can boast the distinction of putting the idea in concrete shape as it was through the efforts of the lodge, backing Otten, that the first fiesta was held in 1907.” Otten shared, "I got the idea from the old practice in Europe of holding flower fiestas. One day in the Elks club I took it up with the lodge and the first thing I knew preparations were under way for a meeting of various lodges, which was finally held and at which William Sibson, then president of the Rose Association, presided as chairman pro tem."

"Mr. E. W. Rowe, who later was elected president of the Festival, represented the lodge and at the meeting we developed the idea that a rose festival would advertise to the world that our climatic conditions we right, because where roses grow luxuriantly, agriculture will flourish."

"At this meeting some opposition developed because several present did not like the idea of using beautiful blooms to decorate floats. This kind of patter got what was coming and due to it and with an almost unanimous vote we decided to hold the first rose festival."

On the evening of May 18, 1907, as reported in The Oregon Daily Journal, "delegations from various organizations and numerous individual rose enthusiasts" gathered at the chamber of commerce auditorium to "discuss plans for a rose festival." Otten was in attendance and was actively involved in the committee making plans for the first Rose Festival, contributing to discussions on rose displays and the floral parade, underscoring his leadership in its inception. Secretary E.B. McFarland of The Rose society, stated in The Oregon Daily Journal before the meeting started, "We want suggestions and the united support of all organizations in order to make a rose festival a complete success. The Rose society has no definitive plan to suggest at this time, and the meeting this evening is to bring out the ideas of all and formulate the best and newest into a program for a big and successful festival."

Otten explained the reasoning behind choosing the date of the new Rose Festival, stating, "We staged the show, parade, and all at the same time the usual Rose Show was held in the Forestry building on the fair grounds."

The meeting on May 18, 1907, was a result of George Otten bringing the idea for a rose festival to the Portland Lodge of Elks, which then organized a gathering to bring together various other groups, including the Rose Association and the Rose Society, to help make the event a reality.

The Portland Lodge of Elks maintained operational control over the first Rose Festival. On July 10, 1907, as report in The Oregon Daily Journal, Mr. E. W. Rowe—of the Portland Lodge of Elks—was President of Portland's First Rose Show and fiesta. He was presented with an award for "making the rose show a success, business men of Portland this morning presented a handsome loving cup to E. W. Rowe....for Mr. Rowe's work during the carnival. As president he devoted a great deal of his time and labors..." The Elks Lodge was the driving force behind the festival's actual formation and the logistics of the first event.

Launched in 1907, the Rose Festival cemented Portland's "Rose City" identity. In 1914 Otten stated that "The [first Rose] festival was a success, an overwhelming triumph. People awoke to the importance of the rose as a basis for community advertising and from that small beginning the big festivals we now hold grew. We never suspected that they would reach such magnitude—but I'm mighty glad they have and only hope the festival will remain a permanent proposition."

Otten's involvement in the 1907 fundraising suggestion for the 1908 Rose Festival, as noted in The Morning Oregonian on October 12, highlighted his continued role in its organizational framework, leveraging his expertise from his flower shop and greenhouses.

=== Expanding floral business and landscape artistry ===
Otten's prominence as a florist grew within Portland's floral community. By October 12, 1907, The Morning Oregonian listed him among local florists supporting a fundraising suggestion for the Rose Festival, demonstrating his active role in its early planning and his influence among peers. On May 5, 1910, The Oregonian recognized him as a "Landscape Artist," detailing his design of the grounds for Portsmouth School and Peninsular School, enhancing educational spaces with aesthetic and functional landscapes. This work underscored his growing reputation in both horticulture and landscape design.

=== The Oaks ===
In a gardening news article from 1954 in The Oregon statesman it stated that around 1904 Otten "planted the first mass display of begonias at Oaks Amusement Park," in Portland, Oregon.

The Morning Oregonian report in 1909 that "The Oaks has undergone a thorough rearrangement and landscaping under the direction of George Otten. Thousands of roses have been set out, particular attention having been paid to grouping them with reference to color and habit of growth so as to give the most pleasing effect."

"In addition to the myriad of roses at the Oaks this season, there will be about 50,000 Summer plants that will rival the queen of flowers in beauty. Visitors will see 1000 tuberous begonias, flowers almost unknown here, but which seem well adapted to cultivation in Portland. Besides these begonias, asters, etc., will beautify the grounds and make a veritable flower garden of the resort. A collection of perennial plants is also about to be set out there that will add to the beauty. The lawns have been spaded and newly sown, affording a velvety green frame to the floral picture."

The varieties of roses planted at Oaks Park were: Frau Karl Druschki, Madame Caroline Testout, Ulrich Brunner, Paul Neyron, Gruss, Teplitz, Marie von Houtte, Maman Cochet, among others.

The formal rose garden at Oaks Park was established six years after the rose plantings at the Lewis and Clark Exposition, foreshadowing the development of the Portland International Rose Test Garden, which was constructed in 1917.

=== Founding the First Annual Fall Flower Show ===
Otten masterminded the First Annual Fall Flower Show on November 15–16, 1912, at the Armory, dubbed the "biggest flower show ever held in the Northwest." His plan, detailed in The Sunday Oregonian on November 10, turned the space into a "miniature park" with tropical plants and paths, prioritizing artistry and featuring rare specimens grown in his greenhouses. Otten also served as a judge, assessing exhibits that included his own roses, described as "exceptionally fine." The Oregon Daily Journal on November 16 hailed it as a "Portland Institution," promising annual returns. His photo appeared in The Oregonian on November 3, underscoring his prominence.

=== 1913 Flower Show ===
Otten's influence continued with the 1913 Flower Show, planned for spring by the Oregon State Florists’ Association, as reported in The Oregonian on December 10, 1912. Building on the 1912 show's success, where he judged and exhibited his roses, his leadership ensured continuity, strengthening the Portland flower scene.

== Later life in Seaside and begonia mastery ==
Otten moved to Seaside in 1917 where he cultivated tuberous begonias. His begonia work attracted global visitors to his Seaside garden and greenhouse(s). In 1935, at age 74, he published Tuberous-Rooted Begonias and Their Culture, a definitive work. It was noted in The Oregon statesman on February 21, 1943, that George Otten's "little book on tuberous begonias has gained a wide circulation."

A September 22, 1937 article in The Capital Journal in reference to a fall flower show stated that "receipt of word that an exhibit of tuberous rooted begonias would be entered by George Otten, of Seaside." "The Seaside exhibit is expected to attract considerable attention from the many flower growers in this section. Otten is a prominent flower specialist and has published books on the culture of flowers."

An article in the Oregon statesman in 1937 writes that Otten's hybridization work on "tuberous-rooted begonias for many years....has developed some outstanding plants." His work in tuberous begonias extended his floral legacy.

The Capital Journal on September 24, 1937, noted that George Otten of Seaside is "the oldest living florist in the state, recognized as one of the leading culturists of begonias."

== Personal life ==
Born in Bremen in 1861, Otten died in Seaside in 1954 at age 93. His son, George Herman Otten (1889–1978), was a noted landscape architect. One grandson, George William Otten (1923–2016), was a landscape architect, and another, Thomas Otten Paine (1921–1992), was a NASA administrator. His great-granddaughter, Janet Lee Otten, was also a landscape architect, who continued the family's horticultural legacy.

== Legacy ==
George Otten's legacy—planting 5,000 roses at the Lewis and Clark Exposition, leading Rose Day, designing and judging at the Fall Flower Show, founding the Rose Festival as "the originator of Portland's Rose Festival," and educating Portlanders—shaped the city's floral identity. His exposition and park advocacy, emphasizing local talent, influenced the Portland International Rose Test Garden's establishment in Washington Park, while his civic roles, flower shop at NW 23rd Avenue and Burnside, and greenhouse(s) at NW 23rd Avenue and Burnside and Seaside, Oregon, beautified public spaces. His work in hybridizing tuberous-rooted begonias "has developed some outstanding plants." From 1885 to 1954, Otten's work left Oregon with a richer horticultural heritage and global renown.

Otten's obituary on February 19, 1954, in The Capital Journal states: "Seaside (UP)—George Otten, internationally known horticulturist, died yesterday. Otten was born at Bremen, Germany, and came to this country in 1884. He was credited with revolutionizing horticulture in olive groves of California. He also was an authority on begonias. At one time he was in charge of the royal botanical gardens of King Ludwig in Germany."
