= American Inn =

Former hotel in Portland, Oregon

Coordinates: 37.09857°N 88.68391°W

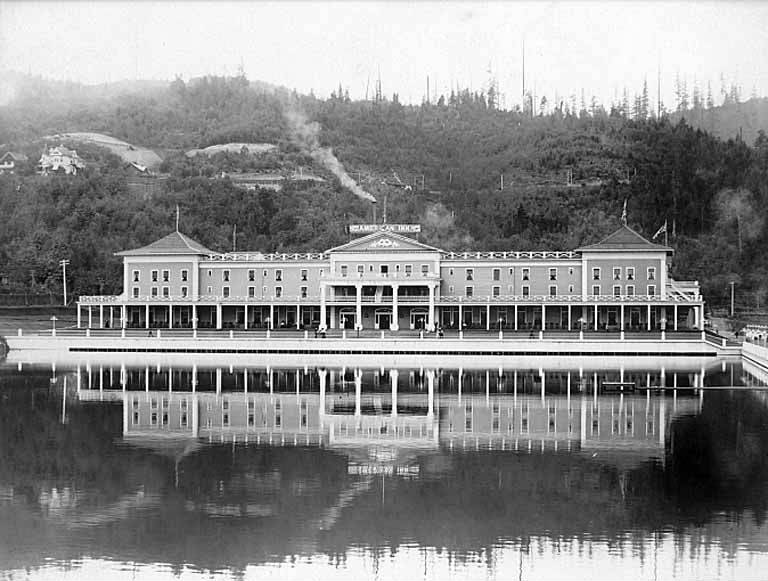
American Inn

The American Inn was the sole hotel on the grounds of the Lewis and Clark Centennial Exposition held in Portland, Oregon, in 1905. As advertised in a local newspaper, the Inn was "beautifully located on the main esplanade on the shore of Guild's Lake" and provided guests with easy access to the Exposition's many wonders. It was also touted in the paper as "A Woman's Enterprise," "a monument to the business ability of women, as it was planned and is now managed by Mrs. J. T. McCready."

After the end of the Exposition, the materials used to build the Inn were sold, and a portion was used to build an apartment building at a nearby location. According to a local newspaper, "Although the American Inn, like most of the buildings upon the Exposition grounds, is to be razed to the ground by the hand of the wrecker, the materials of which it is composed are destined to be of more permanent service than those of some of the other buildings. Dr. John Carlyle, the purchaser of the Inn, is now erecting a large apartment-house on the north side of Northrup street, ... and the woodwork used in its construction is to come almost entirely from that building." As of 2020. This apartment building, now named the American Inn Condominiums, still stands at 2129 Northrup Street as one of the few remaining relics of the Lewis and Clark Centennial Exposition.
