= Louis J. Bader House and Garden =

Historic building in Portland, Oregon, U.S.

- U.S. National Register of Historic Places
- Portland Historic Landmark
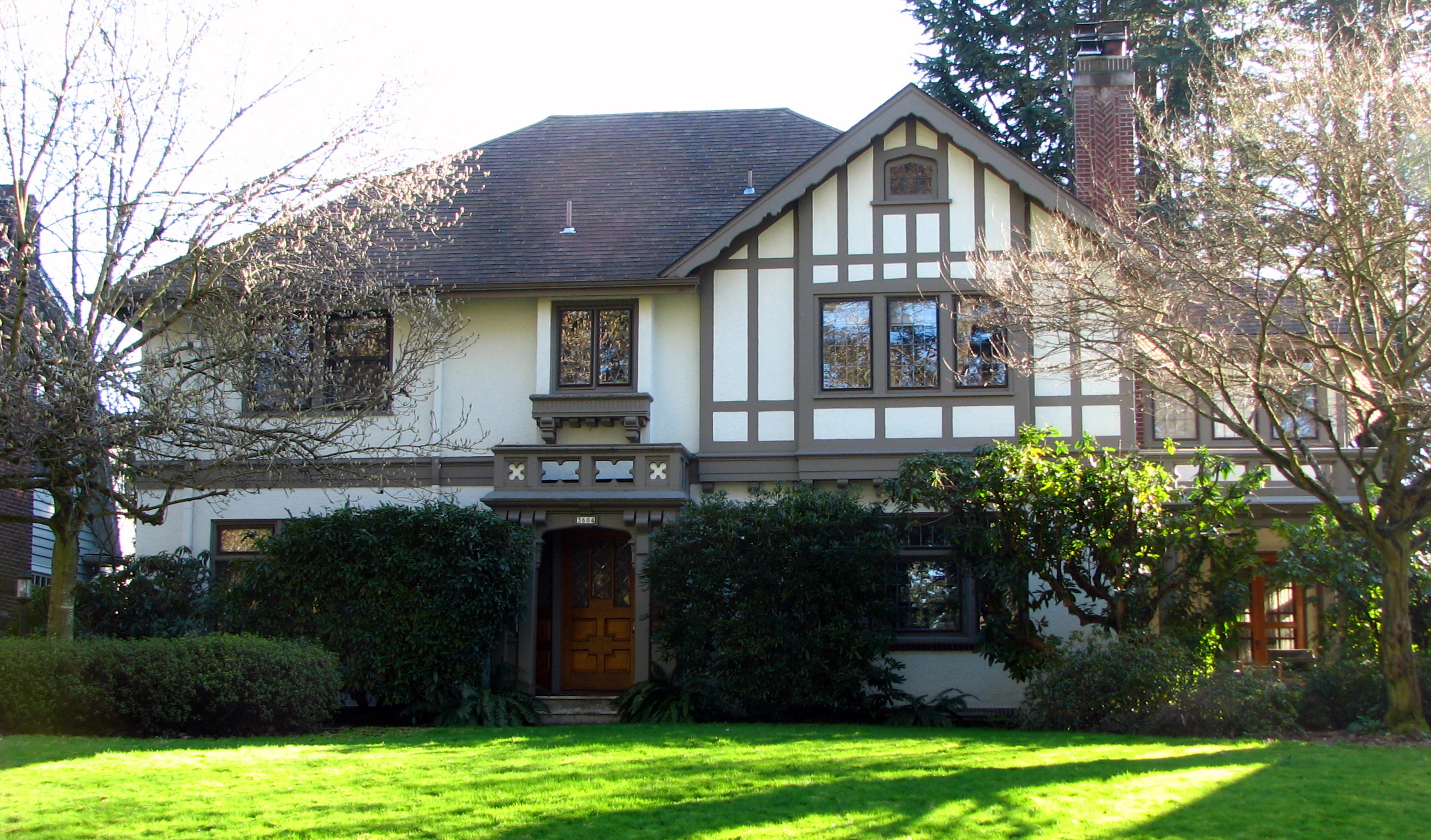
- Bader House in 2010
- Location: 3604 SE Oak Street; Portland, Oregon
- Coordinates: 45°31′12″N 122°37′37″W
- Area: 12,750 square feet (1,185 m^{2}) (lot size)
- Built: 1922
- Built by: Otto Salzman
- Architect: DeYoung and Roald (house); George Otten (landscape)
- Architectural style: Tudor Revival
- NRHP reference No.: 89001856
- Added to NRHP: October 30, 1989

The Louis J. Bader House and Garden in southeast Portland in the U.S. state of Oregon is a 2.5-story single dwelling and garden listed on the National Register of Historic Places. Built in Tudor Revival style in 1922, it was added to the register in 1989.

Designed by DeYoung and Roald Architects of Portland, the L-shaped house sits on a 75-by-170-foot (23 by 52 m) lot opposite Laurelhurst Park. One of several luxurious houses in the neighborhood, it has a steeply pitched hip roof, tall multipaned leaded windows, massive chimneys, stucco cladding, and decorative half-timbers. The interior features oak and mahogany woodwork, Italian marble and tile, large fireplaces, ornate fixtures, and a built-in vacuum system. A ballroom, a billiards room, and a wine cellar are main features of the finished basement. The house also has a partly finished attic with a bedroom, maid's room, bathroom, and storage space. George Otten, a landscape engineer for the Oregon State Highway Commission, designed the property's formal garden, with paths of Italian marble, a sundial, a pergola, and a circular flower bed, among other features, at the rear of the house.

Louis Bader, the original owner of the house, was a lumberman from Illinois who moved to Portland in 1910. He became involved in real-estate marketing, particularly in the Laurelhurst district. In 1909, the Ladd Estate Company, influenced by the ideas of Frederick Law Olmsted, had laid out Laurelhurst as a residential subdivision built on the Hazelfern Farm property of William M. Ladd. Bader, who financed construction of some of the houses in Laurelhurst, lived in the house with his wife, Lillie, and children until 1936. In 1938, the Baders sold the house to Merl Margason, a Portland neurologist.

== See also ==
- National Register of Historic Places listings in Southeast Portland, Oregon
