= Gelatin (disambiguation) =

Gelatin is a translucent food ingredient. It may also refer to:

- Gelatin dessert
- Gelatine (airship)
- Gelatin (artist group)
- Gelignite, also known as blasting gelatin
- Gelatin, a character from the second season of Battle for Dream Island, an animated web series

== See also ==
- Starch gelatinization
