= Thomas H. Wright =

American teacher and electrician (1873–1928)

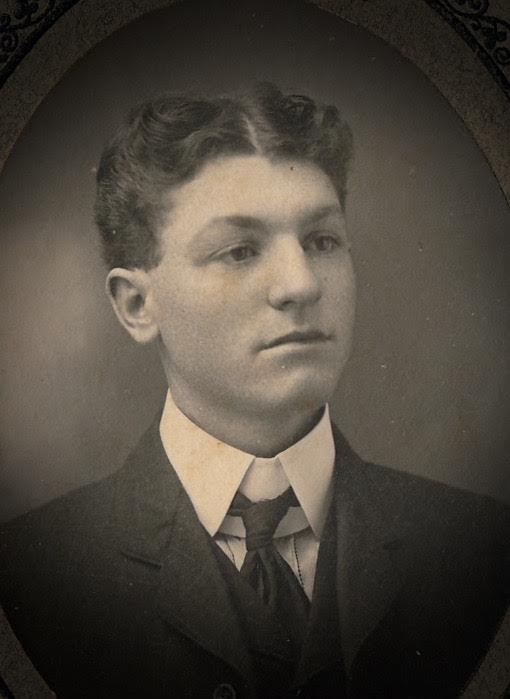
Thomas Wright in 1895

Thomas H. Wright (October 24, 1873 – June 4, 1928) was a teacher and electrician. While working for Portland General Electric, he designed the electrical lighting for the 1905 Lewis and Clark Centennial Exposition in Portland, Oregon.

== Early life ==
Wright was born on October 24, 1873, to George and Eliza Wright. He had two older siblings, Jane and Samuel Wright, and was raised on a dairy farm in northern Iowa, near Fort Dodge. At the age of 17, Wright traveled to Portland, Oregon, to experience life in the West.

Upon arriving in Portland, Wright worked odd jobs: building houses, loading and unloading ships at the Port of Portland, and teaching in the Portland Schoolhouse for 6 months from 1892. On February 21, 1893, the following opinion article was published in the Oregonian newspaper:

Thomas Wright has brought new inspiration to the education system. [...] In addition to the required English and Mathematics courses, he has provided a refreshing addition of Practical skills, most notably Construction. He is a firm believer of the "hands-on" method of instruction, and has taken his classes on a number of botanical field-trips, most centered around the discovery of edible plants.

== Lewis and Clark Exposition ==
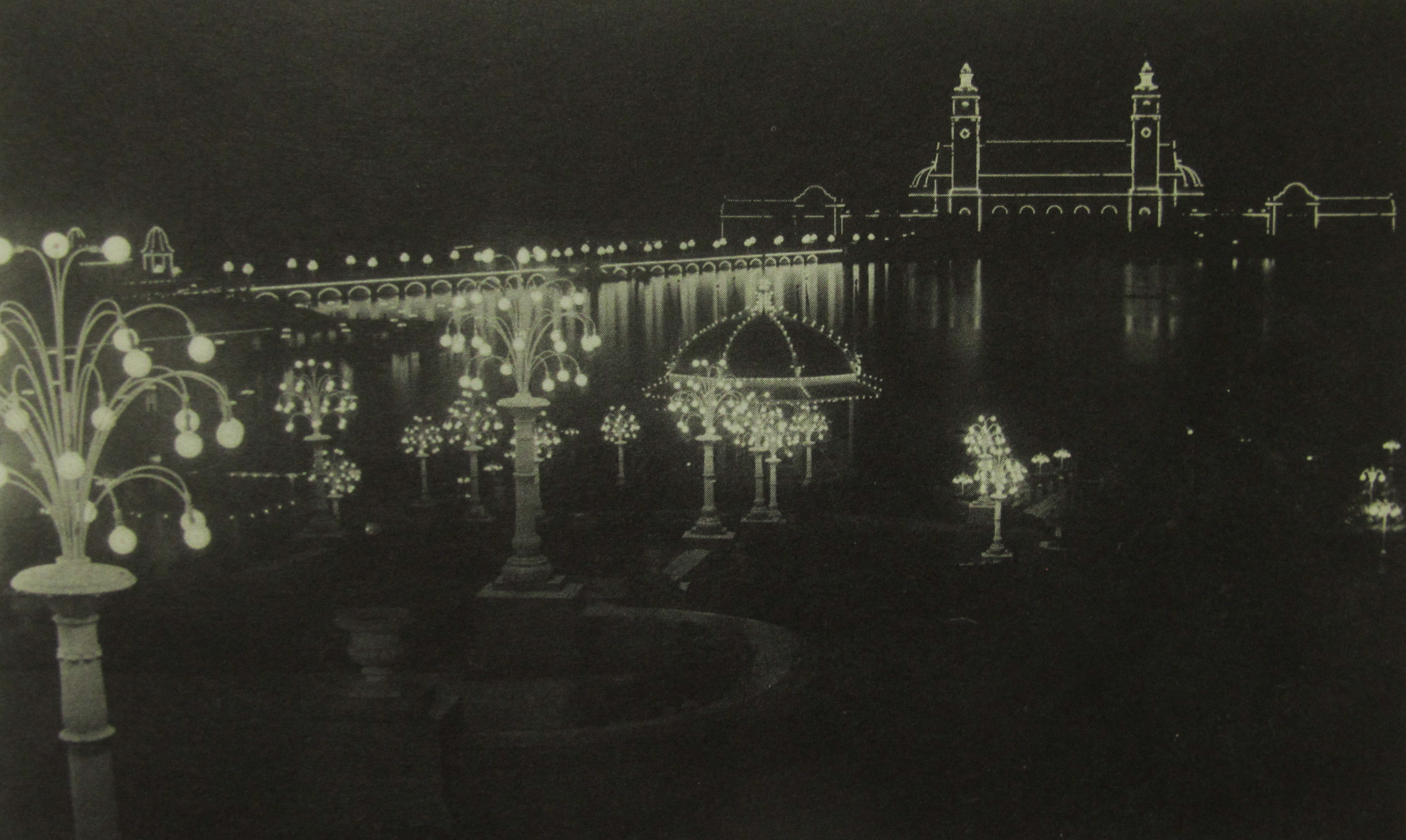
Illuminated Fairgrounds at the Centennial Exposition, designed by Thomas H. Wright

In 1893, Wright was hired in the Portland General Electric's new City-Eastside Electric Light Plant. In 1904, as preparations for the Lewis and Clark exposition were underway, Wright advised Portland General Electric to consider lighting the fairgrounds, which would give it a greater standing in the eyes of Portland and the world. The company was not well respected by major eastern stockholders, which had limited its growth, and would need greater funding if it was to build another generator to power the fairgrounds. Henry H. Goode, the president of Portland General Electric, traveled to New York in the spring of 1905, so stockholders would invest a total of three thousand dollars to build a new plant. Wright, meanwhile, was put in charge of designing the electrical plans for the fairgrounds. When Goode returned confirming that the money was available, construction began on Wright's plans.

Many of the lighting technologies of the World's fair had never been implemented in such a scale before the fair, including the incandescent lights around Guild's Lake and the Forestry Building, and large searchlights on top of the fair's Government building.

== Later life ==
After the fair, Wright continued to work as an electrician. On June 2, 1928, Wright fractured his skull, after falling while repairing electrical cables. He died two days later, in Portland, Oregon, and was buried in Lone Fir Cemetery.

== Legacy ==
In the book Bringing Power to Ideas, the Portland General Electric Company recognized the influence that Wright had had on their company's continued prosperity throughout the twentieth century.
