= Eastman–Shaver House =

Historic building in Portland, Oregon, U.S.

- Eastman-Shaver House
- U.S. National Register of Historic Places
- Portland Historic Landmark
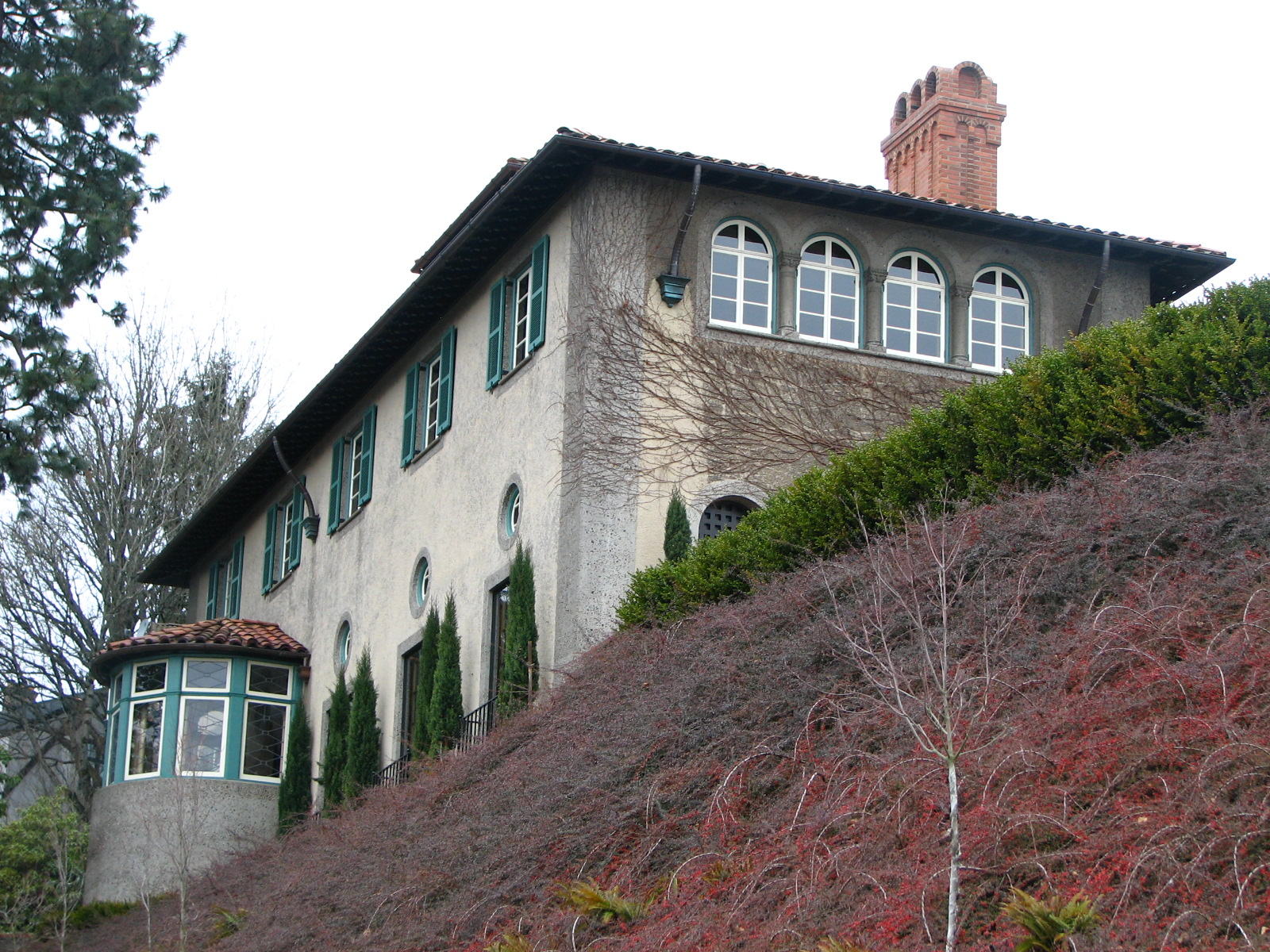
- The Eastman-Shaver House in 2009

- Location within Portland, Oregon Location within Oregon Location within the United States
- Location: 2645 NW Beuhla Vista Terrace; Portland, Oregon
- Coordinates: 45°31′32″N 122°42′18″W
- Area: less than one acre
- Built: 1928
- Architect: Hollis E. Johnston, Miles K. Cooper
- Architectural style: Late 19th and 20th Century Revivals, Mediterranean
- NRHP reference No.: 85001528
- Added to NRHP: July 9, 1985

The Eastman–Shaver House is a house located in northwest Portland, Oregon, that is listed on the National Register of Historic Places.

The 32-room house was built in 1928 for Watson Eastman, who founded Western Cooperage Company, a pioneer of mechanization in the forest products industry, and also owned Hawley Pulp and Paper Company. Its second owner was Leonard R. Shaver, who was affiliated with the Shaver Transportation Company, serving as its vice president starting in 1922, and later becoming its president in 1950 and chairman of the board in 1967.

The property sold in January 2018 for almost $7 million. The sale set a new record for the highest amount ever paid for a home and property in Multnomah County.

The property includes formal gardens designed by noted landscape architect George H. Otten.

== See also ==
- National Register of Historic Places listings in Northwest Portland, Oregon
