= Henry E. Dosch =

Colonel Henry Ernst Dosch
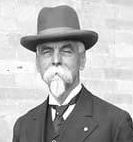
- Born: Henry Ernst Dosch; June 17, 1841; Mainz-Kastel, Germany
- Died: February 7, 1925 (aged 83); Hillsdale, Oregon, United States

Henry Ernst Dosch (1841–1925) was a German immigrant who served in the American Civil War and later became a successful merchant, horticulturist and author in Portland, Oregon, United States. Dosch served as the Commissioner General and Director of Exhibits for the 1905 Lewis and Clark Centennial Exposition and Oriental Fair in Portland and as Director of Exhibits for the 1909 Alaska-Yukon-Pacific Exposition in Seattle.

== Early life in Germany ==
Dosch was born on June 17, 1841, in Kastel, Germany and was one of seven children born to Colonel John B. Dosch and his wife Anna (née Busch), a sister of Adolphus Busch. Dosch attended the Gewerbeschule für Handel und Industrie, graduating in April 1857. Dosch then apprenticed at a large oil importing house in Mainz until January 1860. On January 17, Dosch sailed for America and made his way to St. Louis, Missouri, where he worked as a bookkeeper until the start of the Civil War.

== American Civil War ==
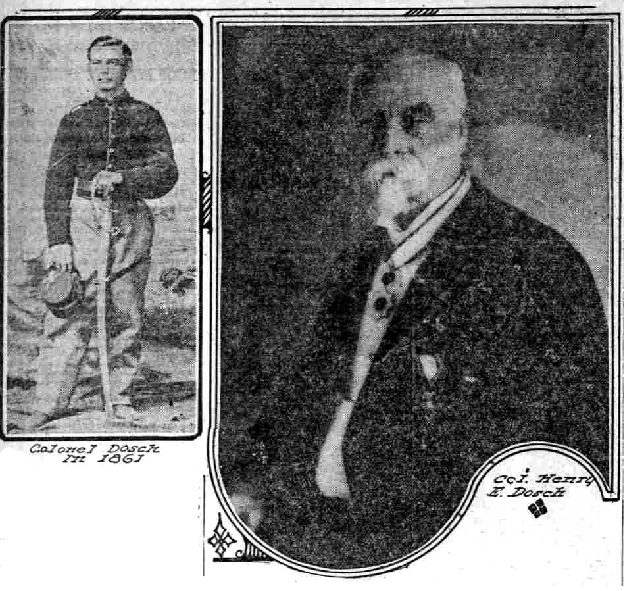
Dosch in Civil War uniform (left) and 1922 photo (right).

In May 1861, Dosch enlisted as a member of General John C. Frémont's body guard and served under Frémont until October 25, 1861, when Dosch was wounded in the right leg during the Battle of Springfield. In March 1862, Dosch was accepted as a member of Company C, Fifth Missouri Cavalry. Dosch was promoted to sergeant of Company C, then sergeant-major of the regiment and then adjutant, and for the last three months he was acting colonel. On the consolidation of the two regiments in 1863, he resigned his position and retired from the service.
