= Rose City Golf Clubhouse =

Historic clubhouse in Portland, Oregon, U.S.

- U.S. National Register of Historic Places
- Portland Historic Landmark
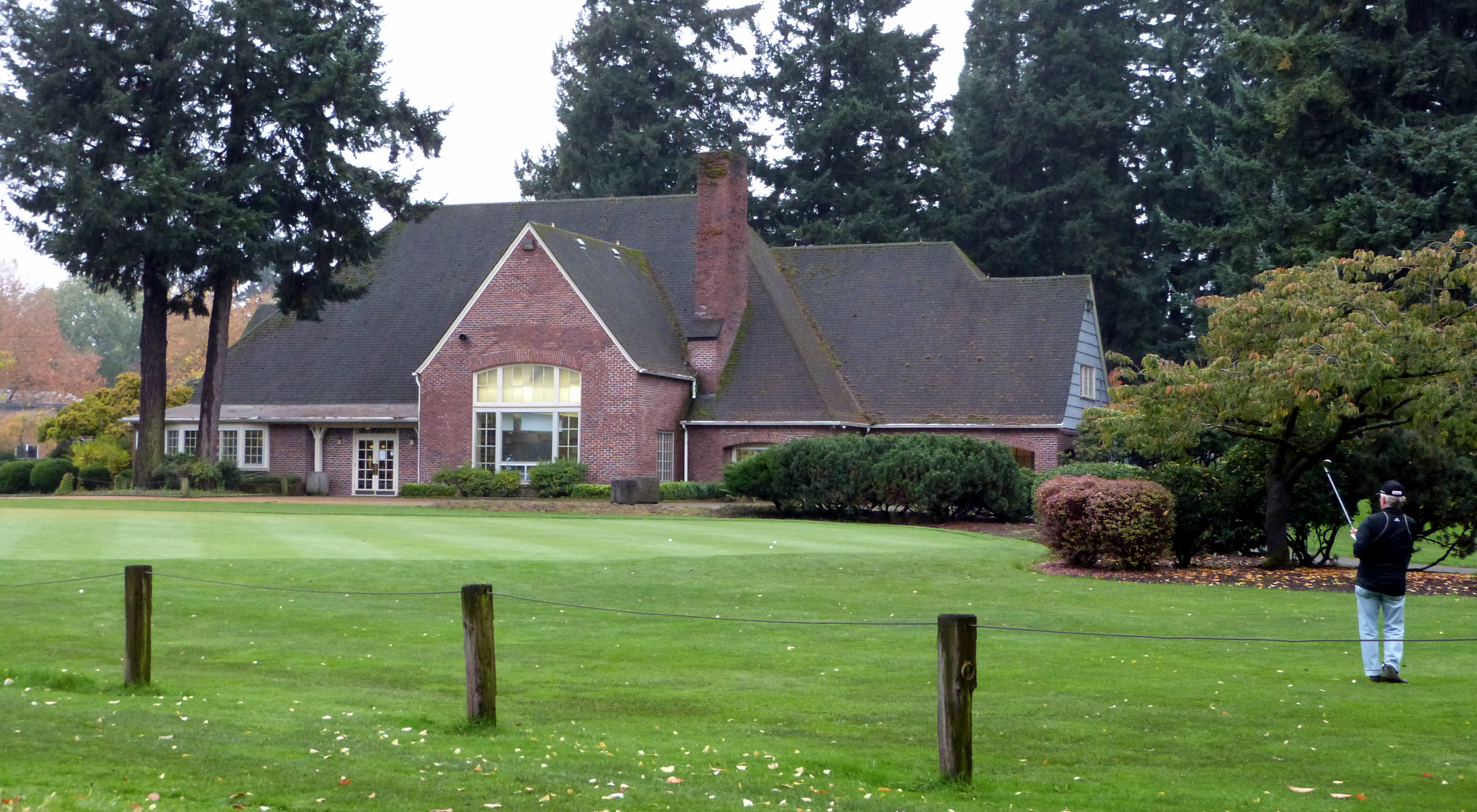
- The clubhouse's exterior in 2012

- Location within the United States Location within Oregon Location within Portland, Oregon
- Location: 2200 NE 71st Avenue; Portland, Oregon
- Coordinates: 45°32′17″N 122°35′24″W
- Built: 1932
- Built by: B. T. Allyn
- Architect: Herbert A. Angell
- Architectural style: English Cottage
- NRHP reference No.: 12000900
- Added to NRHP: October 31, 2012

The Rose City Golf Clubhouse is a building located in northeast Portland, Oregon, United States. It was listed on the National Register of Historic Places on October 31, 2012.

== See also ==
- National Register of Historic Places listings in Northeast Portland, Oregon
