= Lewis and Clark Centennial Exposition =

1905 World's Fair in Portland, Oregon

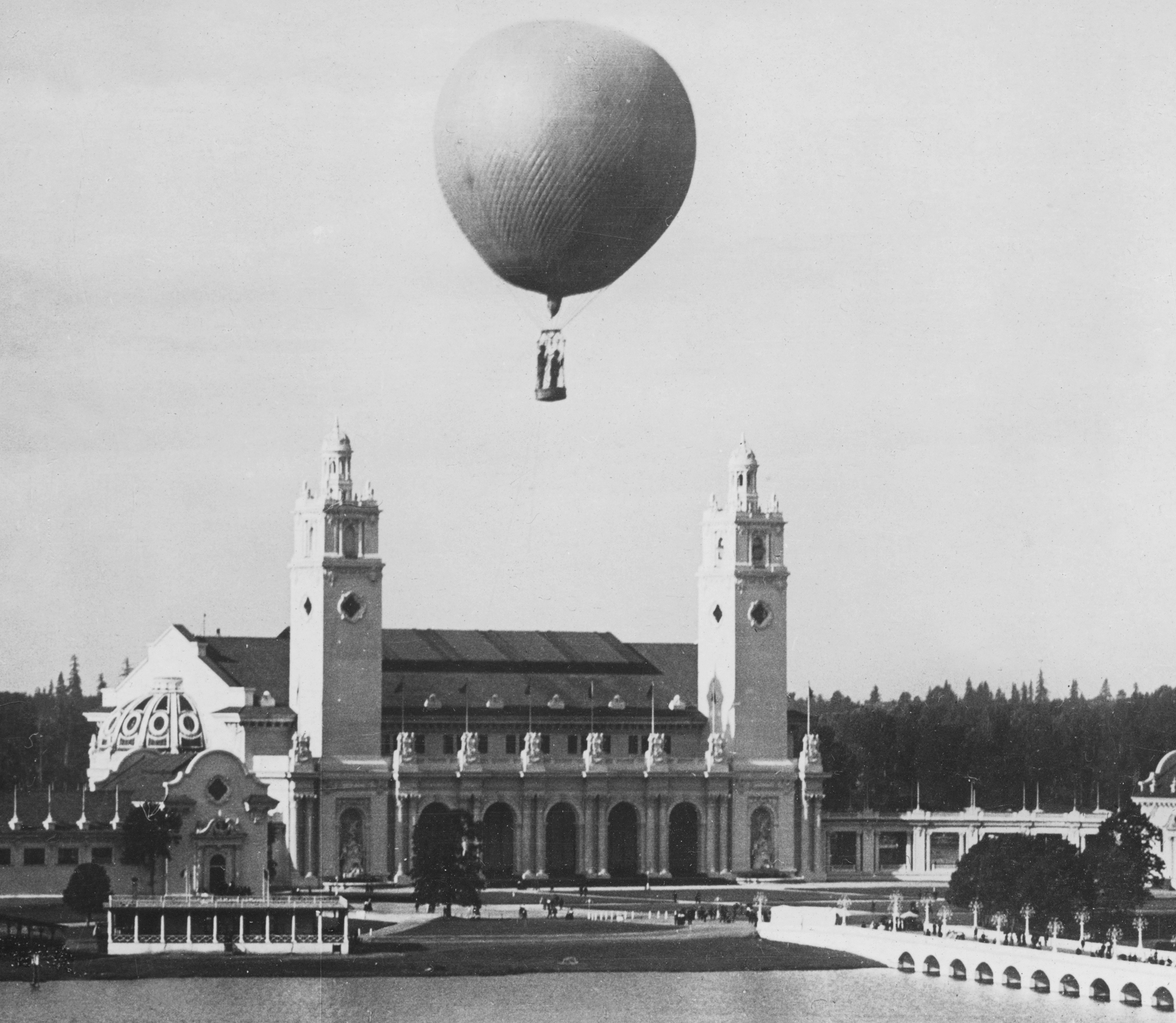
- Balloon over Guild's Lake at the Expo

Official name
- Lewis and Clark Centennial and American Pacific Exposition and Oriental Fair

Details
- Dates: June 1, 1905, to October 14, 1905
- Location: Portland, Oregon, USA
- Coordinates: 45°32′16″N 122°42′26″W
- Attendance: 2,554,000
- Theme: Lewis and Clark Expedition
- Motto: Westward The Course of Empire Takes Its Way
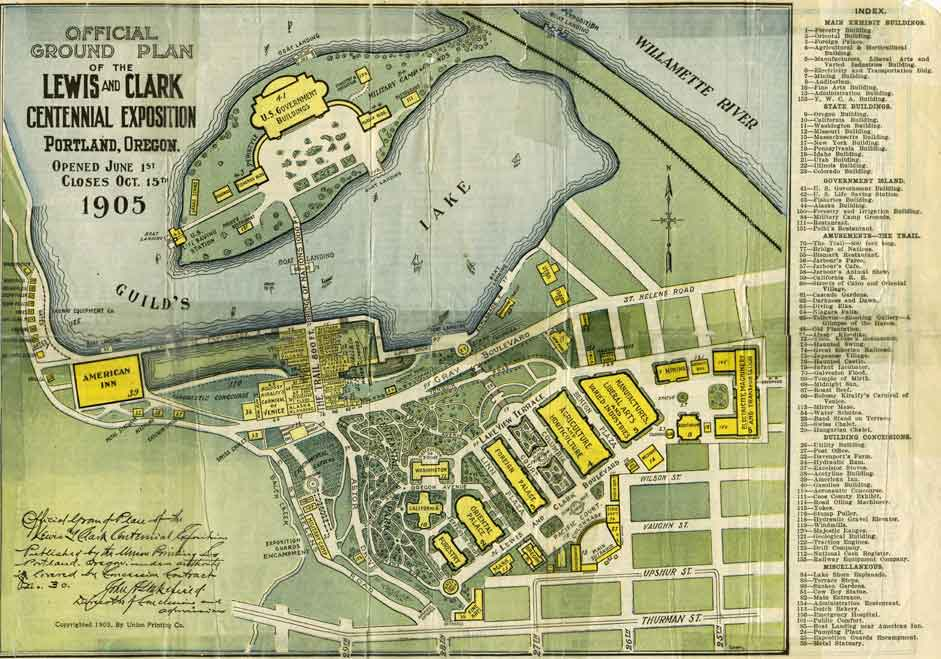
- map

The Lewis and Clark Centennial Exposition, commonly also known as the Lewis and Clark Exposition, and officially known as the Lewis and Clark Centennial and American Pacific Exposition and Oriental Fair, was a worldwide exposition held in Portland, Oregon, United States in 1905 to celebrate the centennial of the Lewis and Clark Expedition. While not officially considered a World's Fair by the Bureau of International Expositions, it is often informally described as such; the exposition attracted both exhibits and visitors from around the world. During the exposition's four-month run, it attracted over 1.6 million visitors, and featured exhibits from 21 countries. Portland grew from 161,000 to 270,000 residents between 1905 and 1910, a spurt that has been attributed to the exposition.

== Preparations ==
=== Early Oregon ===
Since its founding in 1845, Portland had evolved into a major economic center, largely fueled by the arrival of the railroads. Three transcontinental railroads used Portland as their Pacific coast terminus – the Northern, Southern, and Union Pacific Railroads. Meanwhile, Portland's wheat and flour industries were growing at an amazing rate, and Portland held "the largest flour mill on the Pacific coast." The unparalleled timber industry continued to grow, as "Oregon is second [in wooded area], with 54,300 square miles" and "in quantity of standing lumber, Oregon leads the Union, with 300 billion feet ..." Oregon's shipping was growing, too, fueled by a $1.5 million project to dike and dredge the Columbia River. During this time, Oregon's population grew from 13,294 in 1850 to 413,536 in 1900, a 3,000-percent growth, compared to the 1000-percent growth of the nation as a whole.

Despite all these positive factors, though, Oregon was not unaffected by the nationwide Long Depression, which had particular effect in 1893. Jobs were lost across the country as railroads grew too fast on a weak banking system and agricultural values fell. The state's elite business leaders all attempted to devise plans to boost the economy. Dan McAllen, a dry goods merchant, suggested in 1895 "that Portland mark the new century and pull itself out of its economic slump by holding some sort of international fair." Since the area's focus was on other issues, his proposal went unnoticed for a few years. The idea of a fair came up again occasionally, but no concentrated effort was made for various reasons. It was not until mid-1900 that this sort of action began, when "J.M. Long of the Portland Board of Trade put together a provisional committee" to begin planning some sort of fair.

Soon, a permanent board was conceived, and the head of the Portland General Electric Company, Henry W. Goode, became the president of the board of directors. Others included I. N. Fleischner, first vice-president; Oskar Huber, director of works; Colonel Henry E. Dosch, director of exhibits; Henry E. Reed, secretary; and J. A. Wakefield, director of concessions and admissions. These were some of Portland's most wealthy and powerful men, working together to create an event of unmatched grandeur and power.

=== Finding a theme ===
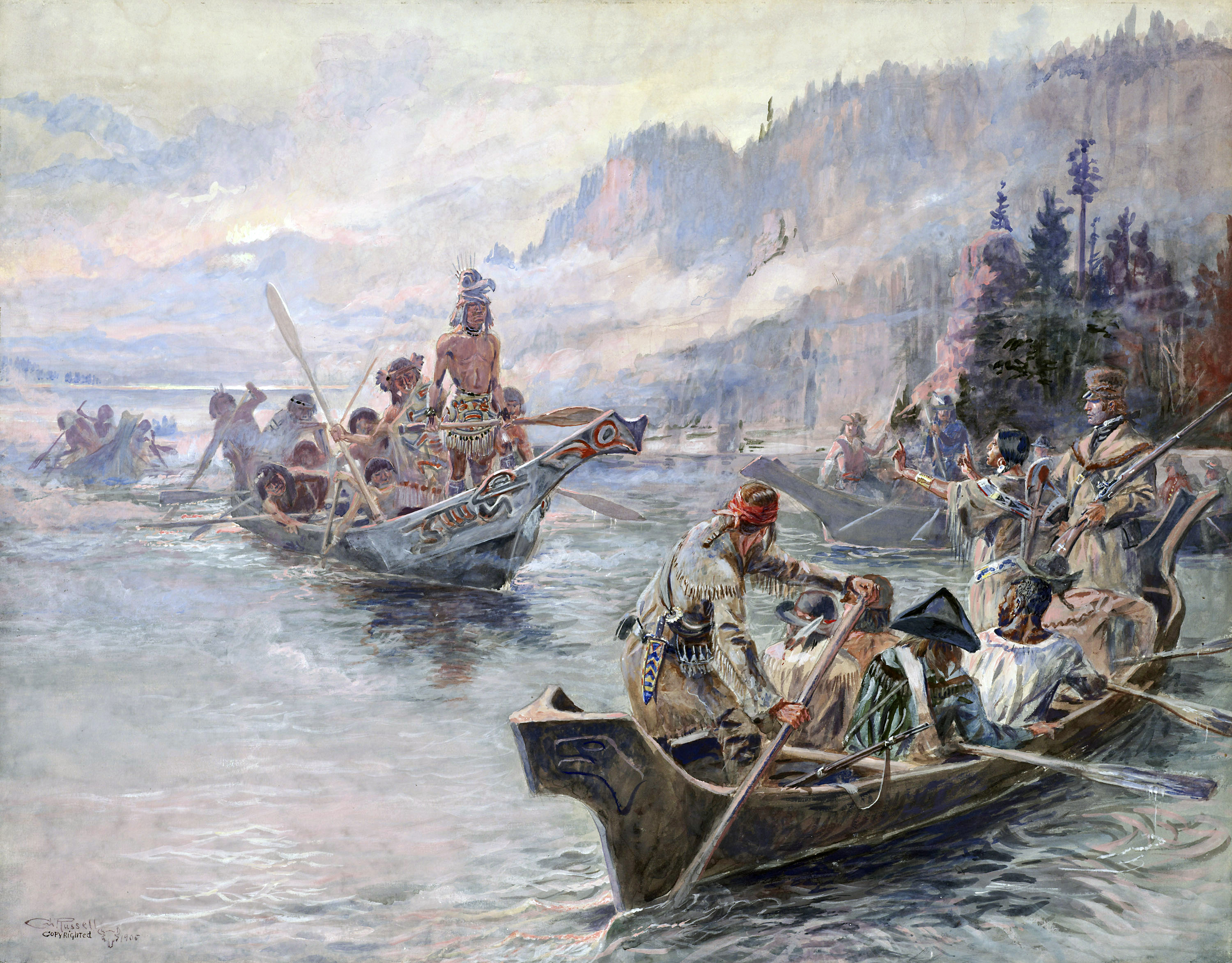
Lewis and Clark on the Lower Columbia

Although the true motivation for the fair came from an economic and business standpoint, it was still crucial to have a theme for publicity and décor. The theme for the Portland fair came from the advice of the Oregon Historical Society. They suggested that the centennial anniversary of the Lewis and Clark Expedition's stay in Oregon would be a perfect event to commemorate. As the directors wanted to include their dreams of economic growth as well, they combined the two ideas into a title that "summed up the dual goals of historic commemoration and regional boosterism: 'The Lewis and Clark Centennial and American Pacific Exposition and Oriental Fair.'" (Note: This title seemed unnecessarily grandiose to some. Rydell called it "breathless" and "perhaps the most unwieldy formal name in the history of world's fairs ..." (Rydell, review of Abbott, p. 532; Rydell, Fair America, P. 57). The "Oriental Fair" portion of the title was added largely to take advantage of a tax shelter providing for trade with the Far East. The absurdity of the title caused it often to be shortened to simply "The Lewis and Clark Centennial Exposition.") In addition, a motto was decided on, to focus the festivities and bolster publicity: "Westward The Course of Empire Takes Its Way."

=== Funding ===
Once a theme was set, the men began securing exhibits and getting support for their investments. Getting government backing was crucial due to the personal investments already made: "The Ladd and Tilton Bank [invested] $20,000, the Northern Pacific Railroad another $20,000, and brewer Henry Weinhard $10,000." (Note: Many of the original investment records and stock certificates are currently in "Lewis and Clark Centennial Exposition (1905, Portland, OR) Records, 1903–1905" Collection, Mss 1609, Oregon Historical Society, Portland, OR, in the archives at the Oregon Historical Society, Portland Oregon.) Many of the substantial investments were from hotels (the Imperial Hotel Company purchased 50 shares worth $5,000), restaurants, streetcar companies, and retailers – all groups with much to gain from the success of the fair and the economic prosperity it could provide. (Note: The OHS manuscripts (Lewis and Clark Centennial Exposition collection, Box 27, Folder 16) have a few original certificates remaining, including 500 purchased by Portland General Electric and 50 purchased by the John Deere Plow Company. As the fair was a grand unveiling of electric power on a large scale, PGE had much to gain from the success of the fair; John Deere, meanwhile, provided a number of items for exhibition and sale. Thus, both companies followed the trend of investing in that which could provide them with much success and profit.) In addition, approximately 3,000 average citizens purchased stock certificates both as investment opportunities and to support what they viewed as a worthwhile venture. These individual investments eventually paid off greatly. (Note: Other certificates are available in Lewis and Clark Centennial Exposition collection, Box 27, Folder 16)

Exposition flag

=== Political action ===
Seeing the potential benefits of the fair's success, the state legislature began planning appropriations for the fair. Although they "had [little] interest in the historical heroes and their 2,000-mile (3,200 km) trek ... they [shared] the vision of Pacific trade that had motivated the exploration and settlement of the Oregon Country." Thus, the Legislature passed "An Act Celebrating the One Hundredth Anniversary of the Exploration of the Oregon Country," which appropriated a sum of approximately $500,000 for the fair. After the Fair's completion, it was reported that

The money expended by the two departments amounted to about four hundred thousand dollars each, the State appropriating that expended by the Commission, while the stockholders of the Corporation subscribed about an equal amount. The proceeds from the Exposition were expended entirely under the direction of the Corporation. The government of the United States appropriated $475,000 and about an equal value in exhibits, the exact amounts of which I am unable to give.

Thus the fair received funding to hold the exposition.

The bill that appropriated the funds also created a special commission to oversee the organization of the fair. As this Commission reported: "The Lewis and Clark Exposition was held jointly, under the authorization of the act creating this Commission, by the Commission and the Lewis and Clark Exposition Corporation." First assembling on May 30, 1903, they were a committee appointed by the government with the intent of sharing the burdens of planning. On this date, they chose a president, Jefferson Myers, who "made a speech ... urging hearty co-operation with the Lewis and Clark directors to bring about the best results. He later repeated these assurances of help to the directors." This seemed to go well, and their assistance helped guide the fair through the governmental hurdles inherent with the planning of such a venture.

After the closing of the fair, Henry Reed, Secretary for the Exposition Corporation, created a hefty volume documenting the whole process of planning and running the event. He, too, spoke highly of the government's involvement, and wrote that "The State of Oregon gave more solid help ... to the Lewis and Clark Centennial Exposition, than any other state of the Union has ever given to an exposition held within its borders." (Note: Reed does also mention, however, that the Commission was often very controlling, overstepping their boundaries and meddling in the affairs of the Corporation, being more of a hindrance than a help. When this testimony is compared with others (most of which offered a favorable opinion), though, Reed's statements can be largely attributed to a personal bias. Reed was, after all, the Secretary of the Corporation, holding a position of considerable power. The Commission was created with little or no input from the Corporation. Reed must have felt slightly jilted by this creation of a group "usurping" his power, and this came through in his narrative. All in all, though, the effects of the Commission were overwhelmingly positive, helping guide the Fair to its successful end.) He was also specifically grateful for the City of Portland's assistance, and noted that their "cordial and enthusiastic backing" was invaluable to the success of the Fair. These praises of Portland were repeated by the State Commission, further supporting the city's great assistance.

== Exposition grounds ==
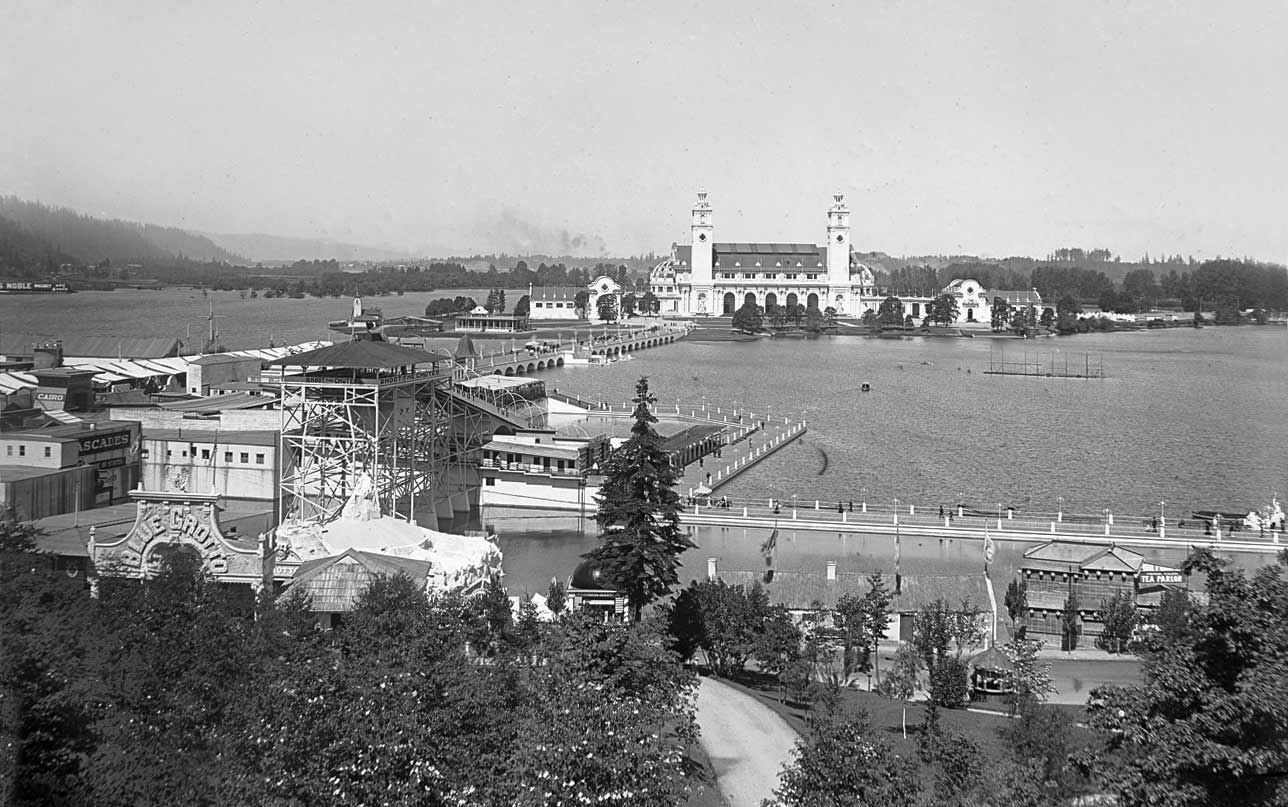
Overview of the grounds

=== Finding a site ===
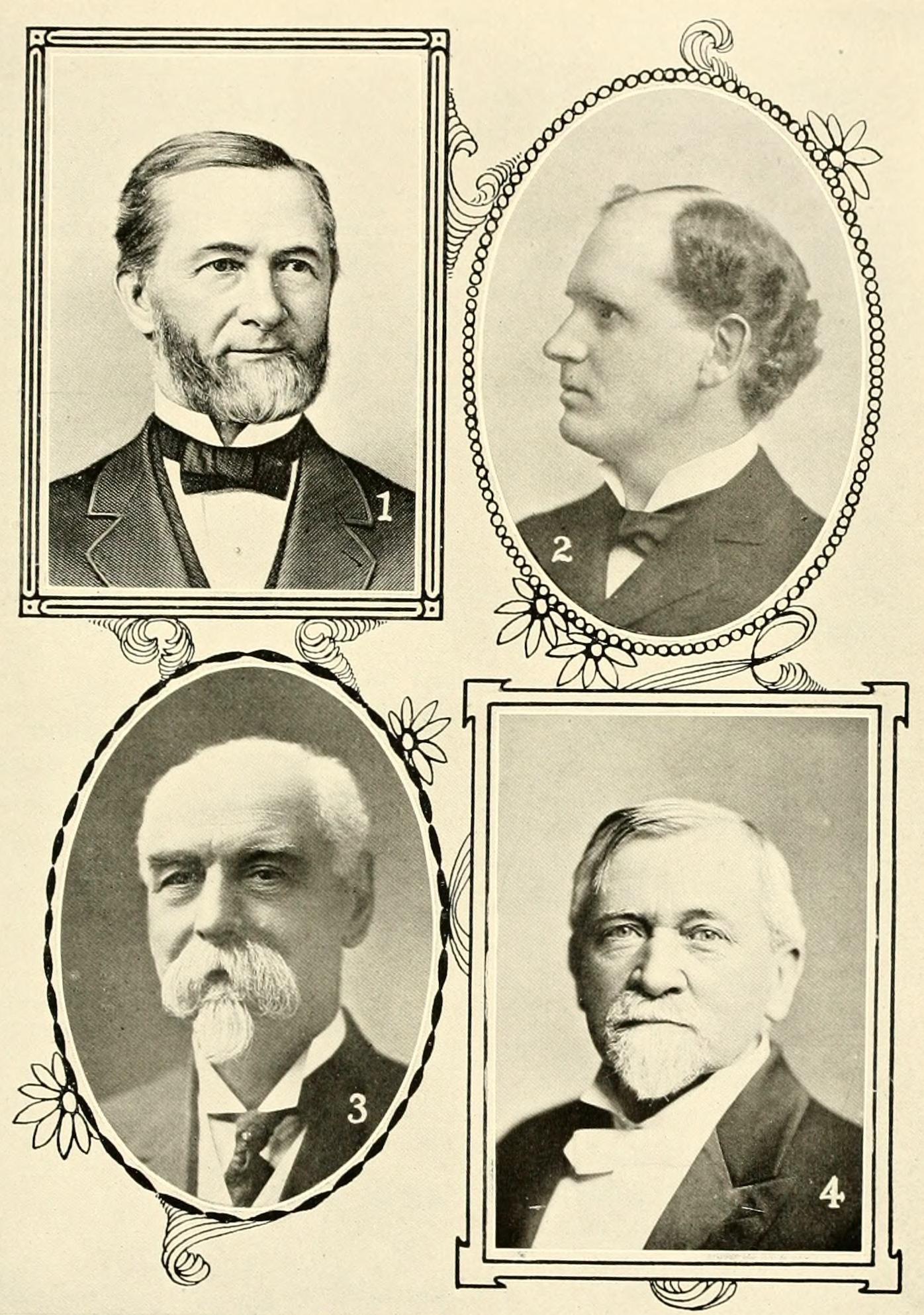
The four people most responsible for the exposition, per Joseph Gaston: 1. Henry W. Corbett; 2. Lewis B. Cox; 3. Henry E. Dosch; 4. Henry L. Pittock

After gaining the necessary financial backing (and the Commission that came with it), the Board of Directors then began the process of choosing a site on which to hold this fair. There were a number of locations considered, on both the east and west sides of the Willamette River. The three main sites on the eastern side were University Park, now the site of the University of Portland; City View Park, now Sellwood Park and Oaks Park; and Hawthorne Park, now an industrial area. The western sites considered were City Park, now Washington Park; and Guild's Lake in the Balch Creek watershed. Guild's Lake was a site "everyone in Portland was vaguely aware of ... [though] no one on the site selection subcommittee could remember whether it evaporated during the dry season." Inspections showed it remained at a depth of 2.5 feet (0.76 m) through the summer, and therefore would be an appropriate site. By September 4, 1902, the Oregon Journal reported: "the fair officials are hot on the trail of a site and it is confidently predicted that 'something will be doing' shortly." The next day, they reported the committee narrowed its choices to "two tracts ... Willamette heights on the west side and Hawthorne Park, with a portion of the Ladd tract, on the east side," and that Willamette Heights was to be chosen, as "It is claimed that the natural advantages offered by the Willamette Heights outweigh all other considerations and that ... Guild's Lake, it is said, can be utilized to great advantage and made a scene of beauty." With this voting, "the Lewis and Clark Exposition had its site – a grove of trees, 180 acres (0.73 km^{2}) of pasture, and 220 acres (0.89 km^{2}) of waist-high stagnant water at the site's center."

Guild's Lake had numerous other advantages. As the site was located on the edge of settlement in Portland, it was easily accessed by the populace. Two local trolley lines (the Portland Railway and City Suburban Railway) ran to within one block of the proposed entrance. Guild's Lake also had the advantage of being located adjacent to the recently constructed Vaughn Street Park, a baseball stadium that would prove rather useful during the operation of the fair. The site was also accessible from the river, and steamers provided visitors a ride to the site for 10 cents.

The site was sold for private development prior to the fair and was leased back to the city for the event.

=== Design and construction ===
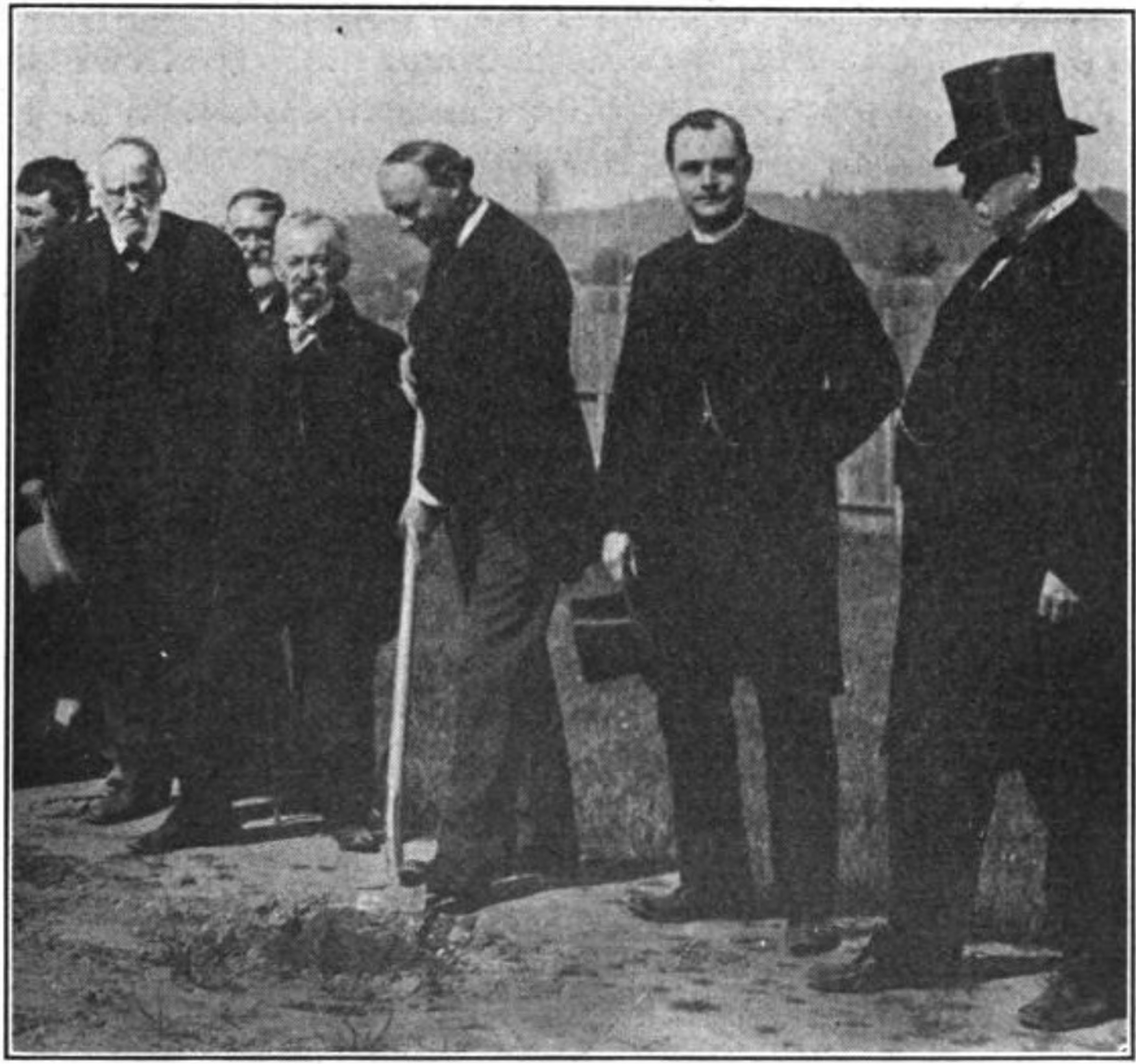
Groundbreaking ceremony of the Expo.

Numerous individuals were involved in the design and construction of the fairgrounds and buildings. The Olmsted Brothers design firm was hired to develop a plan for the grounds, for $5,000. The plan designed by John Charles Olmsted took advantage of the scenic views available from the site, including Mount St. Helens and the river. (Olmsted also developed a plan for Portland's park system during the same visit.)

Ion Lewis, of the firm Whidden & Lewis, supervised a board of seven architects responsible for designing the fair's buildings. The six other architects were Edgar M. Lazarus, Emil Schacht, Justus F. Krumbein, David C. Lewis, Richard Martin, Jr., and Henry J. Hefty. The majority of the buildings were in the style of the Spanish Renaissance and decorated with architectural flourishes such as domes, cupolas, arched doorways and red-colored roofs. The buildings, not intended to be permanent, were largely constructed of plaster over wooden frames, which resulted in rather low construction costs (79 cents per foot).

The major exception to this was the Forestry Building, a log cabin which was said to be the world's largest. It was constructed of 54 long unhewn logs, and contained exhibits of local forestry products, wildlife, and Native American photographs. The building was 206 feet (63 m) long, 102 feet (31 m) wide, and 72 feet (22 m) high (63 m x 31m x 22m), and cost nearly $30,000 The building stood until destroyed by fire in 1964 and inspired the Western Forestry Center as a replacement. It also inspired the lobby of the Glacier Park Lodge in Montana.

The fair was lit up by night with incandescent lights, as well as large searchlights on the Government Building. These were designed by Thomas H. Wright, working for Portland General Electric.

In addition, numerous statues adorned the grounds. Several of the statues remain today, including Alice Cooper's Sacajawea and Jean-Baptiste which now stands in Washington Park. Over 100 thousand light bulbs were used to outline the buildings, bridges, and statues; the result was a spectacular nighttime view.

Some exhibits took up to three years to assemble.

== Exposition ==
The exposition opened on June 1, 1905, and ran until October 15, 1905, a four and a half month span. It included exhibitions from 21 nations and 16 U.S. states, as well as numerous branches of the federal government, and private organizations. The Multnomah Athletic Club, an amateur club from Portland, Oregon, assisted in organizing the Lewis and Clark Athletic Games and Championship Contests.

=== Exhibits ===
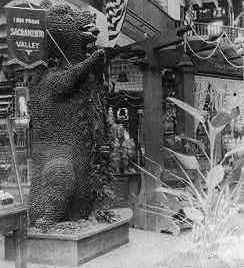
The Prune Bear from the Sacramento Valley

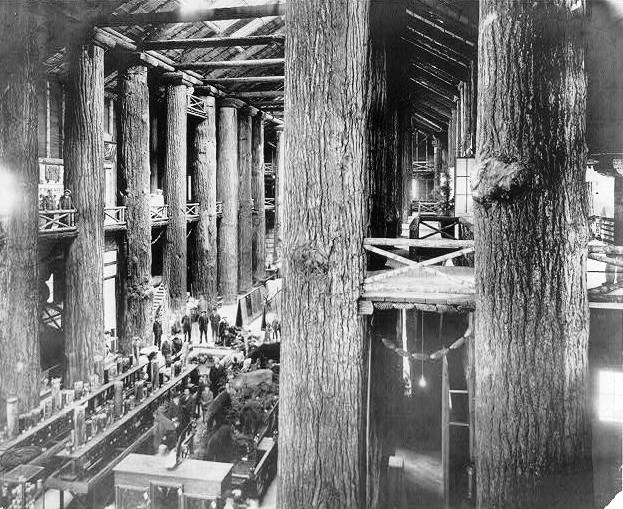
Inside of the Forestry Building

The largest exhibit by a foreign nation was Italy's, whose pavilion contained a large collection of marble statues. Germany and France also spent enormous sums on their exhibits, the latter providing a replica of the drawing room of King Louis XIV. Japan spent $1 million (a significant sum in 1905) on its exhibit, including numerous cultural artifacts such as porcelains, silks, and lanterns.

States with exhibits at the exposition were: Alaska, Arizona, California, Colorado, Idaho, Illinois, Louisiana, Maine, Massachusetts, Missouri, Montana, Nebraska, New York, North Dakota, Oregon, Oklahoma, Utah, Washington, and Wyoming. Each attending state was granted a day to publicize its exhibit, often attended by visiting dignitaries.

There were extensive exhibits on topics such as agriculture, technology, and music. The Mormon Tabernacle Choir sent an exhibit, as did the Smithsonian Institution; numerous famous artists such as Claude Monet were featured. Some of the exhibits were controversial (and by modern standards, offensive), such as an exhibit of Philippines Igorot tribespeople; displayed in order to convince the American populace of the legitimacy of the recent U.S. conquest of the Philippines, taken from Spain in the recently concluded Spanish–American War. The exhibit included Igorots living in a simulated village, engaging in traditional activities. Some of these activities, such as preparation and consumption of dog meat, would be viewed as primitive to most visitors.

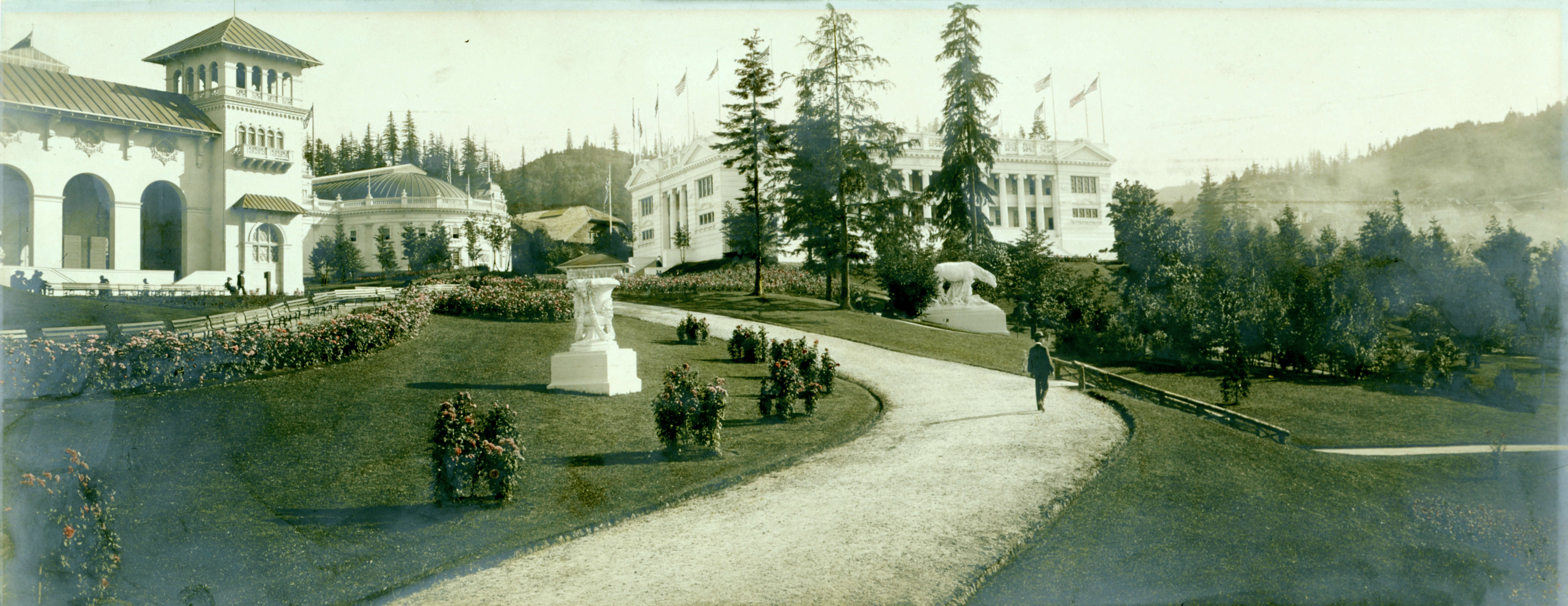
Footpath by roses, Lewis and Clark Centennial Exposition, Portland, Oregon, 1905

The "Many Acres of Roses" exhibit and the Rose Day event were designed and created by a local florist George Otten. He grew 5,000 roses on site for two years for the exposition and decorated the room in the auditorium for a flower show and competition.

Many exhibitors had to be turned away due to lack of space.

=== Other attractions ===
In addition to the major exhibits and pavilions, the site also featured an amusement park, various sideshows, concerts, free motion pictures (a novelty in those days), blimp excursions, and numerous vendors selling food and other items. The site was the finish line for a transcontinental automobile race ("Hell Gate to Portland") by two drivers sponsored by Olds Motor Works. The Amateur Athletic Union's National Track and Field Championships were held in Portland at Vaughn Street Park. Portland's Pacific Coast League baseball team, known then as the "Giants", played the 1905 season at a different venue in Portland. The Multnomah Amateur Athletic Club organized a cricket match at the fair between the Portland Cricket Club founded in 1876 and the Victoria Cricket Club founded in 1852. Consequently, the Pacific Coast tournament was played in Victoria until 1914. (David Sentance US Cricket Historian & author of Cricket in America 1710–2000)

=== Economic effect ===
The fair, by all economic measures, was a major success. Over the entire run of the fair, the box office recorded almost 1.6 million paid admissions, an average of 11,600 visitors per day. Tickets to the fair cost 50 cents for adults, a quarter for children. Forty-thousand visitors attended on the opening day; 50,000 attended on the Fourth of July, and on the anniversary of Portland's incorporation, the daily attendance record of over 85,000 visitors was set. The vast majority (nearly 75%) of visitors were from the Pacific Northwest, with almost half being local residents. In all 2,554,000 people visited the exposition, with 966,000 getting in for free and 1,588,000 paying visitors. 135,000 visitors were from east of the Mississippi River.

Unusual for such expositions, the Lewis and Clark Centennial Exposition was profitable, turning a gross profit of nearly $85,000. Capital investors received a 21% return on their investments. In addition, the impact on the local economy was significant. It is estimated a million out-of-town guests came to Portland, resulting in millions of dollars (in 1905 figures) added to the economy. In addition, construction of the fairgrounds provided 1,000 construction jobs.

== Legacy ==
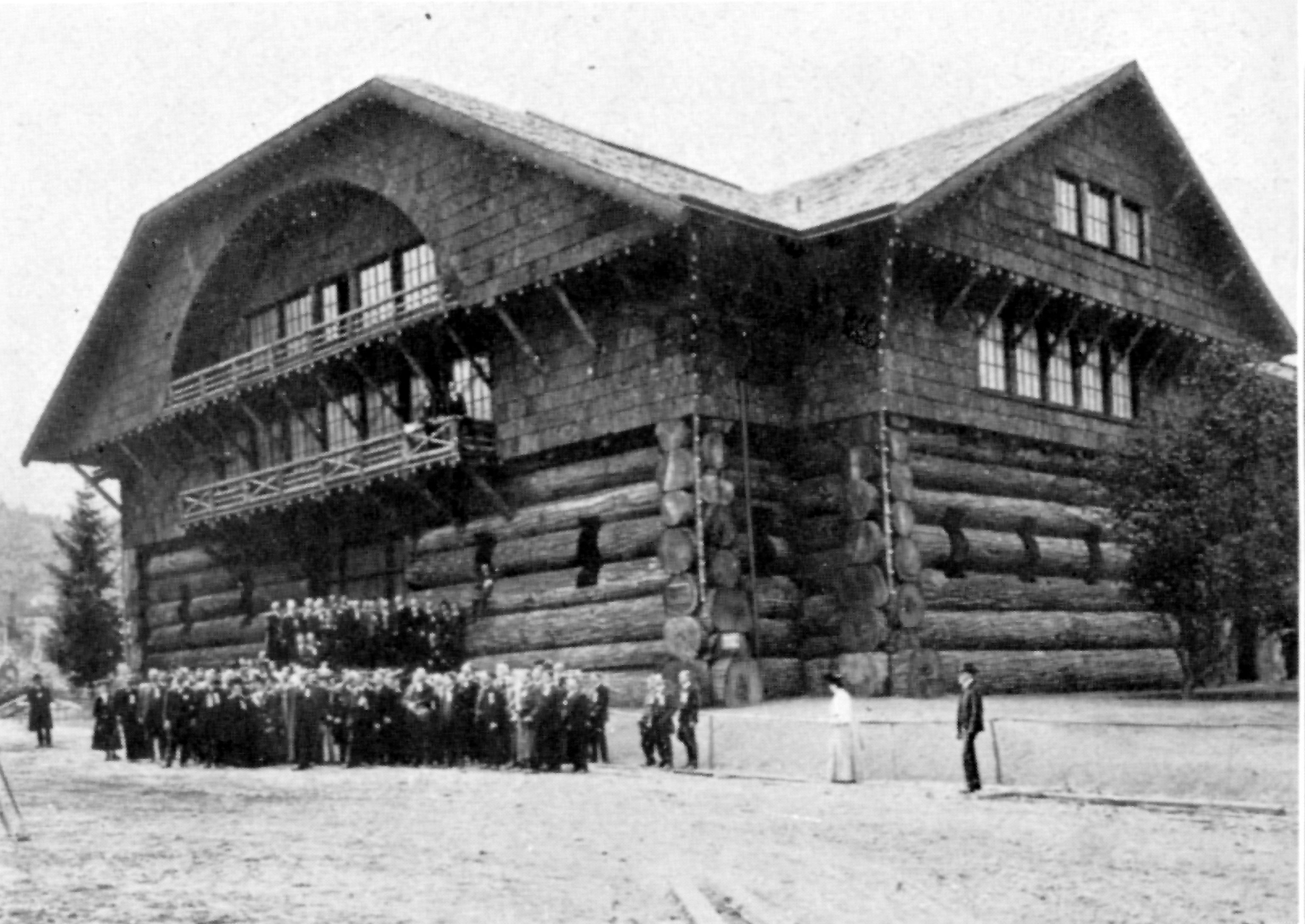
Forestry Building in about 1905

Very little of the Lewis and Clark Centennial Exposition remains today. The vast majority of the structures were designed to be temporary and were torn down the following year, in 1906. A few structures were moved elsewhere and remained in use for a long time, most famously the Forestry Building, which was reinforced with a concrete foundation and converted into a forestry museum. It burned to the ground in August 1964. A replacement museum was built in Portland's Washington Park and is today known as the World Forestry Center. A few buildings from the fair remain standing today, including the Fairmount Hotel, the American Inn, and the National Cash Register Building (now the McMenamins St. Johns Theater and Pub).

About half a million pink hybrid tea rose bushes, all "Mme Caroline Testout," were planted along the streets of Portland for the Lewis and Clark Exposition. Many of these remain today.

Many people moved to Portland following the fair, which is why many houses around Portland were built in the years that followed. There were also many street paving and sidewalk projects in the years that followed the fair, and many of the sidewalks in Portland (East Portland especially) are dated from 1910 to 1920.

Guild's Lake, a cutoff meander of the Willamette River around which the fairgrounds were built, was slowly filled in by industrial developers (and the Port of Portland) in the years after the fair; by the 1920s the lake had vanished entirely. Over the years, the grounds have been used for a garbage incinerator, a landfill, a rail switching yard, wartime housing, and warehouses. Today the ground formerly occupied by the lake (and the fairgrounds itself) is still used for primarily industrial purposes, and has been designated an Industrial Sanctuary by the City of Portland.

== See also ==
- Harvey W. Scott, president of the Exposition, 1903–1905.
- Oregon Centennial Exposition

== Bibliography ==
- Lewis and Clark Centennial Exposition (1905, Portland, OR) Records, 1903–1905 collection, Portland, OR: Oregon Historical Society
- Abbott, Carl (1981). The Great Extravaganza: Portland and the Lewis and Clark Exposition. Portland: Oregon Historical Society. p. 13.
- Piper, Edgar B. (April 1905). "Portland and the Lewis and Clark Centennial Exposition". The American Monthly Review of Reviews. 31.
- Reed, Henry, History of the Lewis and Clark Centennial Exposition (Unpublished, available at the OHS under the Call Number of Mss 383B)
- Reed, Henry E. (April 1904). "The Great West and the Two Easts". North American Review. 178.
- Young, Frederic George (1903). "The Lewis and Clark Centennial: The Occasion and Its Observance" . Oregon Historical Quarterly. 4 (1).
- Zwick, Jim. "World's Fairs and Expositions: Defining America and the World, 1876–1916".
