= George H. Otten =

American landscape architect (1889–1978)

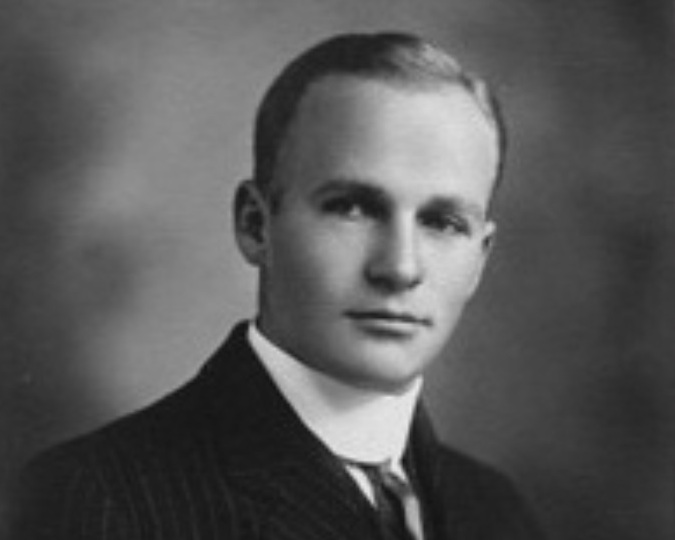
- Born: June 21, 1889; Portland, Oregon, U.S.
- Died: March 26, 1978 (aged 88); Beaverton, Oregon, U.S.
- Education: University of Oregon; Columbia University; University of Montpellier
- Occupation: Architect

George Herman Otten (June 21, 1889 – March 26, 1978) was an American landscape architect who worked primarily in the U.S. state of Oregon. Born and raised in Oregon, he served in World War I before later working for the Oregon State Highway Department where he worked on projects such as the design of the Oregon State Capitol's mall.

== Early life ==
Otten was born in Portland, Oregon, where his father was a landscape gardener and florist. In 1911, Otten graduated from the University of Oregon and moved to New York to work for Ferruccio Vitale.

Vitale's composition was often characterized by unifying lines, colors, and textures in an intimate, secluded landscape. In 1915, Frederick Law Olmsted Jr. approached Vitale with a plan to encourage landscape architects in the United States to study in Europe. At about the same time, Vitale formed a partnership, Vitale and Fowler, with a former apprentice. But Otten did not remain with Vitale's new firm.

Otten graduated with a master's degree from Columbia University in 1915. He was in the United States Army from December 1917 to August 1919 and was a private with Company M, 23rd Engineer Battalion. He served during World War I and studied at the University of Montpellier in 1919. He then returned to Portland and continued his work in landscape architecture.

== Career ==
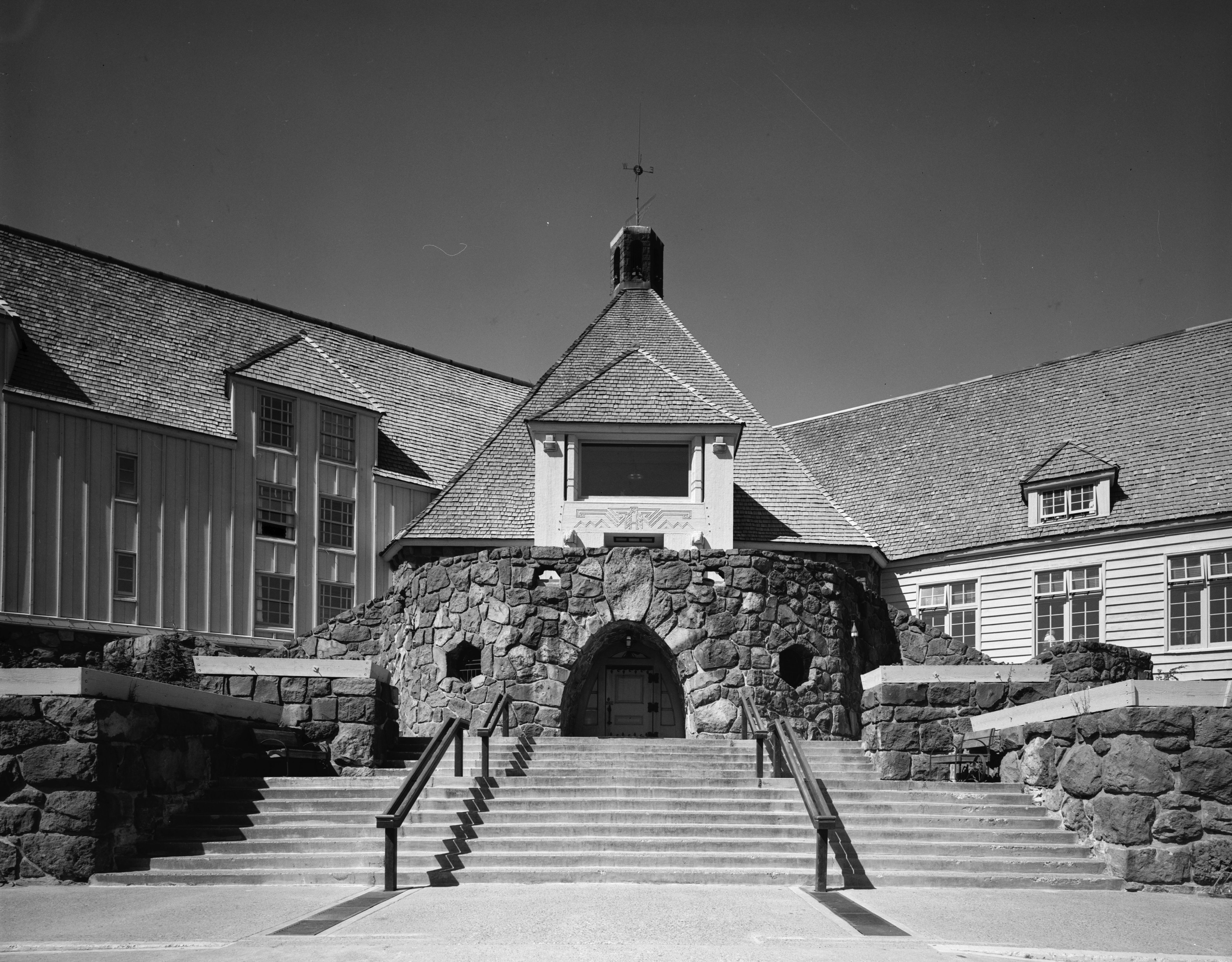
Timberline Lodge

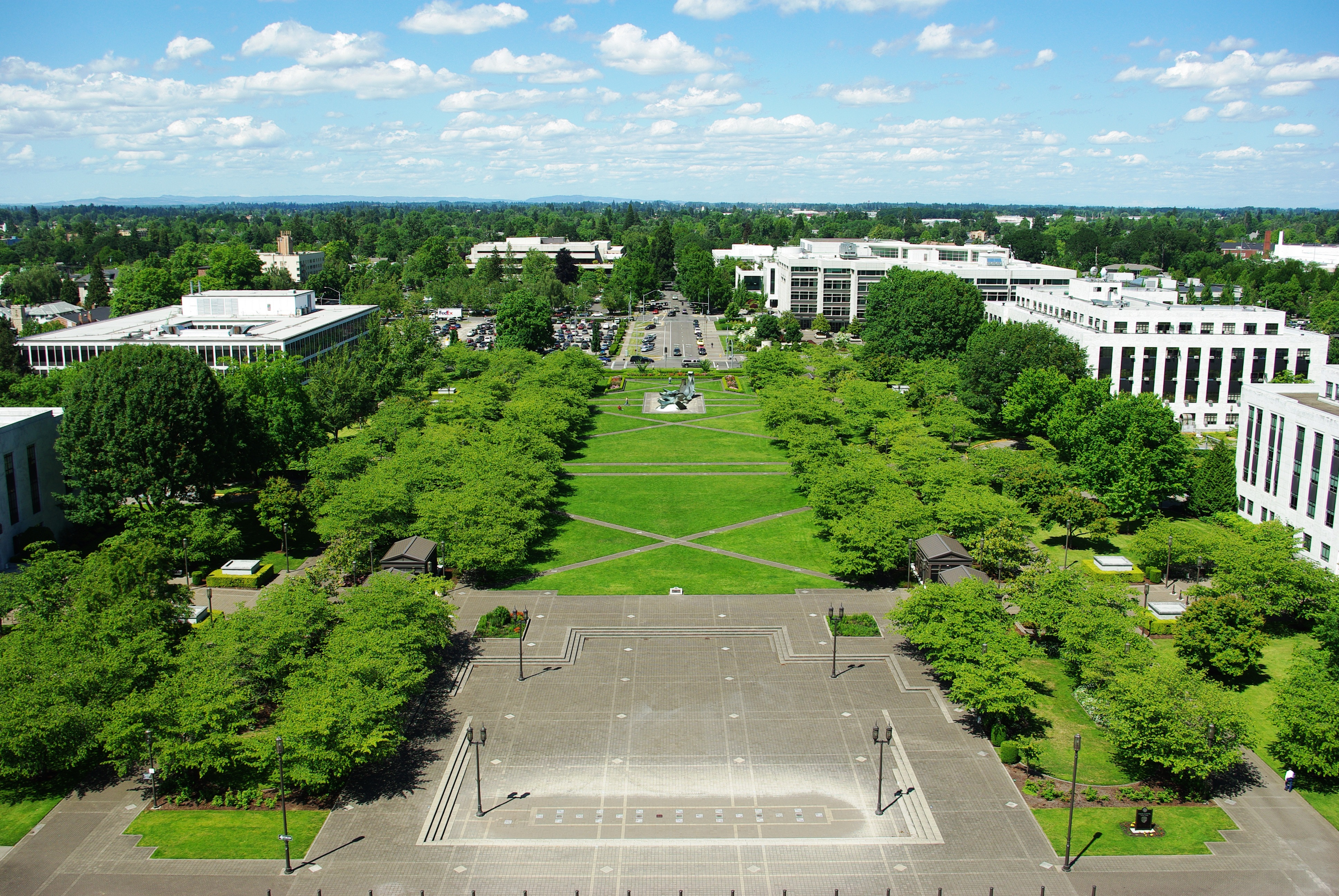
Oregon State Capitol Mall

Otten served as the landscape engineer for the Oregon State Highway Department from 1935 to 1942, and during that time he completed the landscape plan for the Oregon State Capitol mall. Other projects included Portland's Swan Island Airport, White Shield Home, the site location for Timberline Lodge on Mount Hood, Temple Beth Israel in Portland, Canyon Road's entrance into Portland, and the Columbia River Highway's (now Interstate 84) new alignment through the Columbia River Gorge. He also designed the landscaping on a variety of private homes including the Eastman-Shaver House, and for Aaron Frank, Harry Grelin, A. E. Otis, and Carl G. Washburne. He redesigned the grounds of the White Shield Home. Otten also was involved with designs at several golf courses such as Alderwood Country Club, Meadowbrook Golf Course (Colwood National Golf Course), Ralph Lloyd's Golf Course (replaced by the Banfield Freeway), and the Rose City Golf Course in Portland.

Otten died on March 26, 1978, at the age of 88 in Beaverton, Oregon, at a retirement home.
