= Guild's Lake =

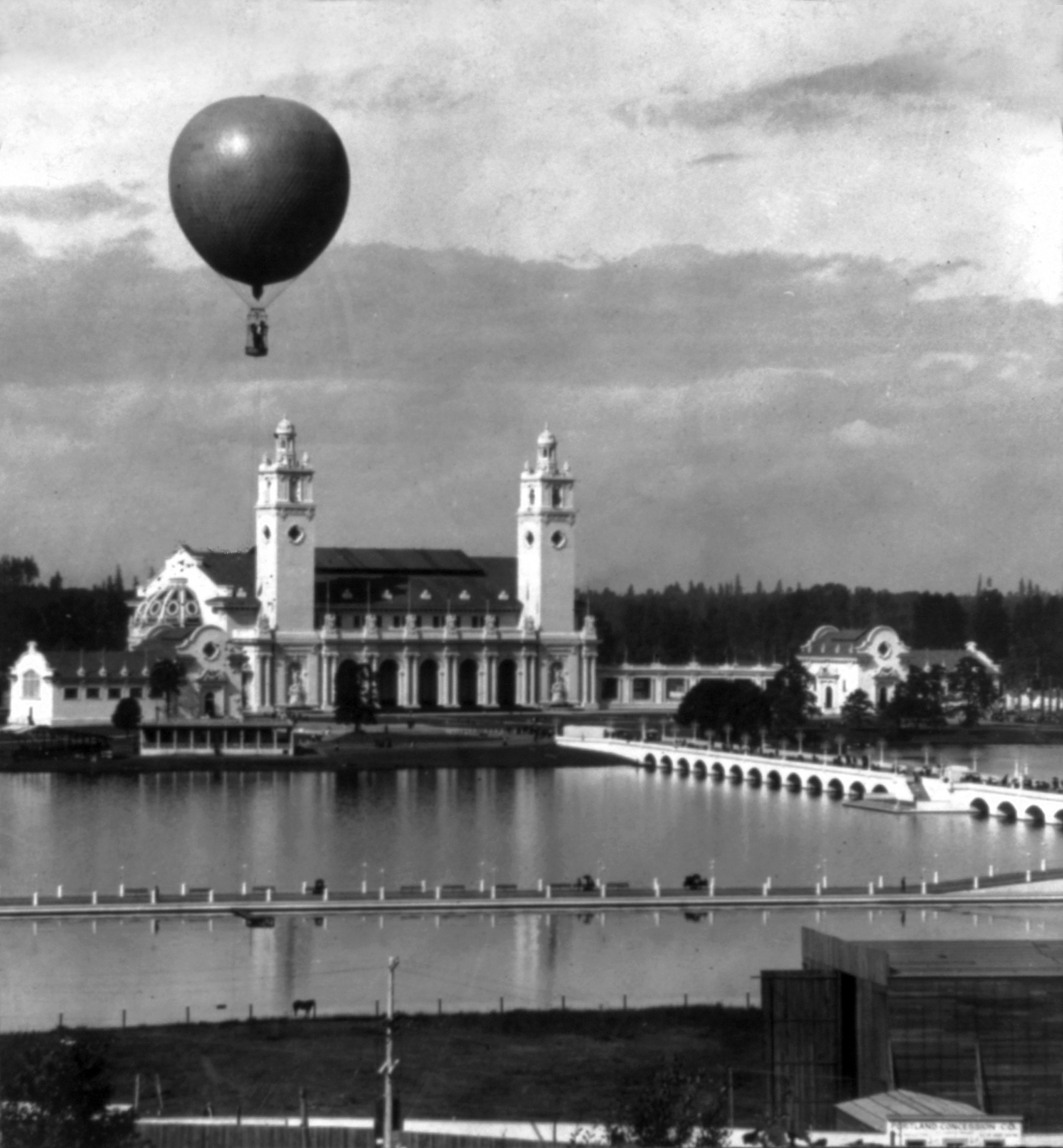
- Exposition balloon over the lake in 1905

- Location of historic Guild's Lake in Oregon
- Location: Willamette River floodplain near Balch Creek; Multnomah County, Oregon, United States
- Coordinates: 45°32′49″N 122°43′14″W
- Type: Lake
- Surface elevation: 33 ft (10 m)
- Settlements: Northwest Portland

Guild's Lake (also Guild Lake) was a flood-prone lowland near the confluence of Balch Creek with the Willamette River in the U.S. state of Oregon. Indigenous Multnomah people established villages on nearby Sauvie Island but not in the swampy area along the Balch Creek side of the river in what later became northwest Portland. The lake was at an elevation of 33 feet (10 m) above sea level between what later became Northwest Saint Helens Road and Northwest Yeon Street, west of Northwest 35th Avenue in the Northwest Industrial district of Portland.

The lake was named after Peter Guild (pronounced guile), one of the first 19th-century settlers in the area. In 1847, he acquired nearly 600 acres (2.4 km^{2}) of the wetlands through a donation land claim. Following Guild's death in 1870, various landowners modified the area to accommodate sawmills, railroads, shipping docks, and Portland's city garbage incinerator. The Guild's Lake Rail Yard, built by the Northern Pacific Railway in the 1880s, became a major switching yard for trains. Channel-deepening in the Willamette during the 1890s enhanced Portland's position as a deep-water seaport, as did the completion of a port terminal in 1914. These developments helped make nearby Guild's Lake an important industrial area of the city.

In 1905, the Lewis and Clark Centennial Exposition was held on an artificial island in Guild's Lake, spurring growth in the area. After the exposition, developers filled the lake and its surrounds with rocks and gravel sluiced from parts of the Balch Creek watershed in the West Hills above the floodplain or dredged from the Willamette River. Civic leaders promoted the Guild's Lake area as a good place for industry, and by the mid-1920s the lake was gone. Instead, it became "a drying and settling mud flat ... awaiting development during World War II". During World War II, the Guild's Lake Housing Project, an adjunct to the Vanport project, provided temporary housing for workers in the nearby Kaiser Shipyards.

After the war, chemical and petroleum processing and storage, metals manufacturing, and other large industries expanded in the area. In 2001, the Portland City Council adopted the Guild's Lake Industrial Sanctuary Plan aimed at protecting the area's "long-term economic viability as an industrial district."

== See also ==
- List of lakes in Oregon
