= Pace von Friedensberg =

Pace von Friedensberg Castronovo Pace
- Noble family
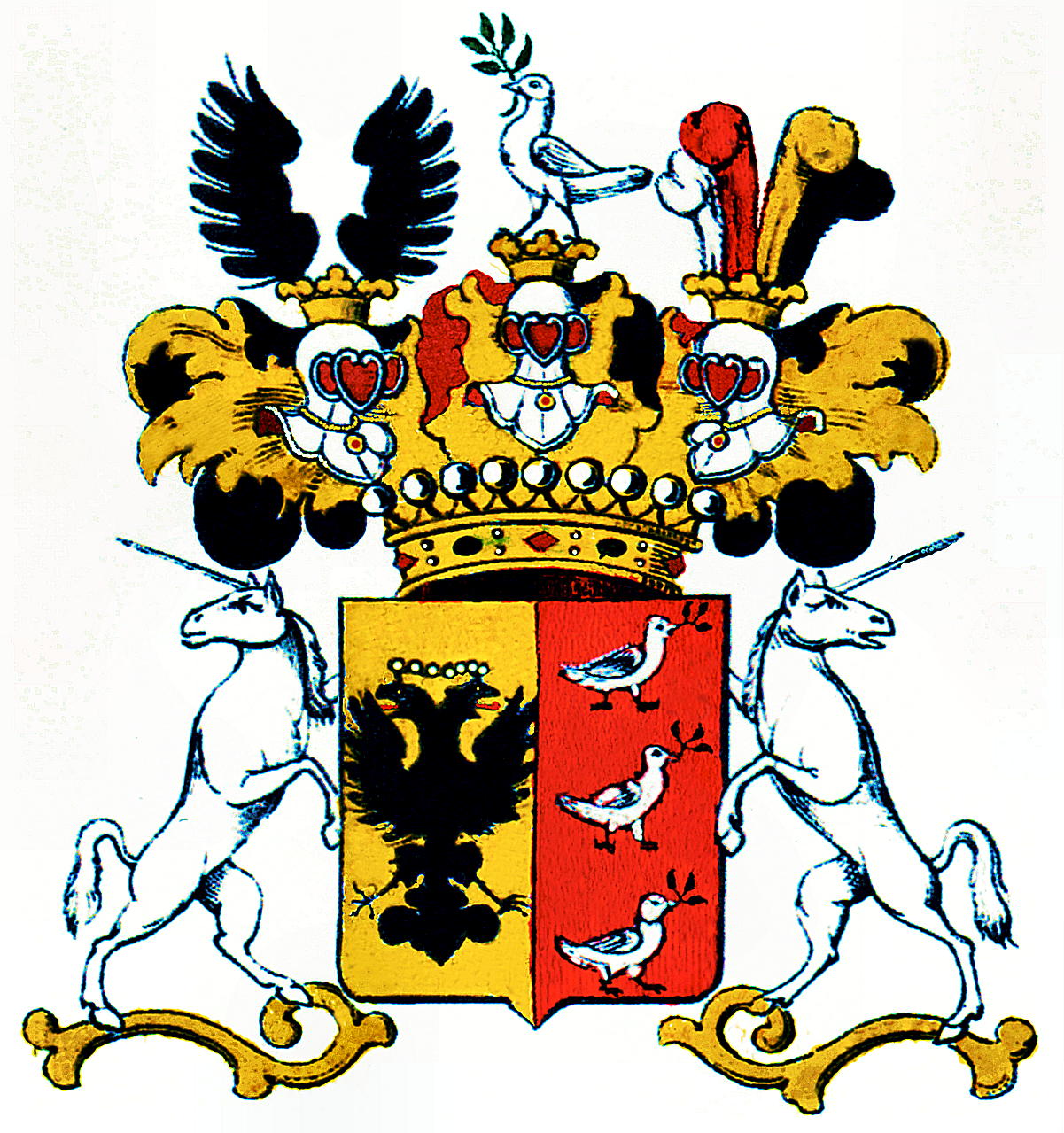
- Origin: Spain
- Titles: Conte de Pace; Graf von Pace; Freiherr von Friedensberg
- Connected families: Barbo von Waxenstein; In der Maur
- Traditions: Roman Catholicism

The Pace von Friedensberg is an Austrian noble family of Spanish and Italian origin. The family held the titles of Imperial Count within the Holy Roman Empire.

== History ==
The Pace family originated from Spain and were elevated to the nobility in 1336. The family later settled in Trieste, Italy before making their way to the Venetian Republic in the fifteenth century. The original Spanish surname may have been Castronovo, and later the title associated with the Castronovo, Conte de Pace, was adopted in Italy as the name. On 5 December 1509 Victor Castronovo seu de Montefumo, Conte de Pace and his brothers received a coat of arms in Heidelberg.

Members of the family served in the Imperial and Royal Austrian military. On 10 December 1675 Carl Maria Conte de Pace (1635–1701) and his brothers Johann de Pace and Andreas de Pace were elevated to the rank of Baron of the Holy Roman Empire (Freiherr) as Pace Freiherr von Friedensberg by Emperor Leopold I. The family held estates in Styria, granted to them on 12 March 1686. In 1690 the Pace von Friedensberg were granted the title of Count of the Holy Roman Empire (Graf) and were given hereditary lands in Austria. The comital branches of the family died out, and the Austrian county was inherited by Count Karl Maria Joseph Pace von Friedensberg of Gorizia. Count Karl Pace von Friedensberg (d. 1827) was married to Countess Maria Anna Therese of Abensperg und Traun (1759-1820), from which the family line continued.

The current branch of the Pace family descends from Count Rudolph Pace and Countess Luise von Beroldingen (b. 1793), daughter of Count Paul Joseph von Beroldingen (1754-1831).

== Notable family members ==
- Carl Maria de Pace, Freiherr von Friedensberg (July 25, 1635 – March 7, 1701), chamberlain of Emperor Leopold I, imperial Field Marshal Lieutenant and Commanding General in Bohemia.
- William Paul Eugen Graf Pace von Friedensberg (March 15, 1819 – November 1896), Governor of the princely county of Gorizia, Gradisca and member of the Upper House of the Austrian Reichsrat.
- Anton Graf Pace von Friedensberg (1851–1923) Imperial and Royal secret councilor, high administrative official and president of the Bukovina.
