= Brandenburgers =

Members of the German Brandenburg special forces unit during WWII

Battalion – December 1939 Division – February 1943 – March 1944 Panzergrenadier-Division – 1944–1945.
- Division "Brandenburg" Vehicle Insignia
- Active: 1939–1945
- Country: Nazi Germany
- Branch: German Army
- Type: Special forces
- Size: Company (initial); Division (at peak)
- Part of: Abwehr
- Garrison/HQ: Stendal; Friedenthal
- Nickname: 'Brandenburg'
- Engagements: World War II

Commanders
- Notable commanders: Theodor von Hippel; Adrian von Fölkersam

The Brandenburgers (German: Brandenburger) were members of Nazi Germany's Wehrmacht special forces unit during World War II.

Originally, the unit was formed by and operated as an extension of the military's intelligence and counter-espionage organ, the Abwehr. Members of this unit took part in seizing operationally important targets by way of sabotage and infiltration. Consisting of foreign German nationals working on behalf of the Third Reich, the unit's members often lived abroad, were proficient in foreign languages, and were familiar with the local culture and customs of the areas where they were deployed.

The Brandenburg Division was generally subordinated to the army groups in individual commands and operated throughout Eastern Europe, in North Africa, and the Caucasus. In the later course of the war, parts of the special unit were used in Bandenbekämpfung operations against partisans in Yugoslavia before the division was reclassified and merged into one of the Panzergrenadier divisions in the last months of the war. They committed various atrocities in the course of their operations.

== Background and membership ==
The unit was the brainchild of Hauptmann (captain) Theodor von Hippel, who, after having his idea rejected by the Reichswehr, approached Admiral Wilhelm Canaris, commander of the German Intelligence Service, the Abwehr. Hippel proposed that small units, trained in sabotage and fluent in foreign languages, could operate behind enemy lines and wreak havoc with the enemy's command, communication, and logistical tails. Canaris was at first against the proposal as he viewed such measures as similar to what the Bolsheviks had done and was suspicious of Hippel's motives. Still determined to form the unit, Hippel looked to his section chief, Helmuth Groscurth, who supported the unit's formation, and the two men conferred on the matter on 27 September 1939. Just a few days after their meeting, the Army General Staff put forth a directive authorizing the creation of "a company of saboteurs for the West." As part of the Abwehr's 2nd Department, Hippel was tasked with creating the unit. Originally, the unit Hippel assembled was named the Deutsche Kompagnie, then later on 25 October it became the Baulehr-kompagnie 800 and then again on 10 January 1940, the unit was called the Bau-Lehr-Bataillon z.b.V. 800 (800th Special Duties Construction Training Battalion); but its later more widely known epithet, "the Brandenburgers", stemmed from the name of the unit's first permanent quarters.

Training for the men in the Brandenburg Division ranged from five to seven months and included course instruction on reconnaissance, swimming, hand-to-hand combat, demolitions, marksmanship with both German and Allied weapons, conventional infantry tactics, and other specialized training. Brandenburg units were deployed as small commando teams to penetrate enemy territory and conduct both sabotage and anti-sabotage operations. Despite their demonstrated successes while incurring minimum casualties, many traditionally-minded German officers still found their use abhorrent. Most of the personnel were fluent in other languages, which allowed them, for example, to penetrate the Netherlands in 1940 disguised as Dutch barge crews just before the start of the invasion. In 1941, they preceded the invasion of Yugoslavia undercover as Serbian workers. During the night before Operation Barbarossa began, Brandenburger units crossed the Soviet border disguised as Soviet workers and Red Army soldiers. Others wore Arab garments to conduct surveillance on Allied warships traversing the Strait of Gibraltar ahead of the Wehrmacht deployment in North Africa. Correspondingly, Department II of the Abwehr, under which the Brandenburgers were subsumed, had a distinct sub-component for army, navy, and air force operations.

Many of the Brandenburgers were misfits who could hardly be characterized as conventional soldiers, due in large part to the nature of their operations. They would infiltrate enemy military formations, secretly countermand orders, redirect military convoys, and disrupt communications, all the while collecting intelligence. Ahead of the forces invading the USSR, operatives from the Brandenburg Division seized bridges and strategically important installations in clandestine missions lasting for weeks before they linked up with advancing forces.

The predecessor formation to the Brandenburg Division was the Freikorps Ebbinghaus, which originated before the invasion of Poland in 1939. Colonel Erwin von Lahousen (and the defense groups of military districts VIII and XVII) from within Department II of the Abwehr, put together small K-Trupps (fighting squads) which consisted of Polish-speaking Silesians and ethnic Germans, whose job was to occupy key positions and hold them until the arrival of regular Wehrmacht units. (Note: A large number of the recruits were small-time criminals who fled from Poland.See: Wrzesień 1939 na Śląsku (September 1939 in Silesia) – p. 37 Paweł Dubiel – 1963.) The first members of the "K-Trupps" were German nationals. Generally, these men were civilians who had never served in the army but were briefly trained by the "Abwehr" and were led by army officers. After the Polish campaign, this changed as these commandos became members of the Wehrmacht. Despite their seeming lack of prior experience, the demands placed on these newly formed commandos were high. It was mandatory that they be volunteers for this duty. They were also expected to be agile, capable of improvising, endowed with initiative and team spirit, highly competent in foreign languages and in their dealings with foreign nationals, and capable of the most demanding physical performance. Eventually, the early guiding principle that required members of the Division Brandenburg to be volunteers ended with their increasing use and integration with the regular army.

== Operations ==
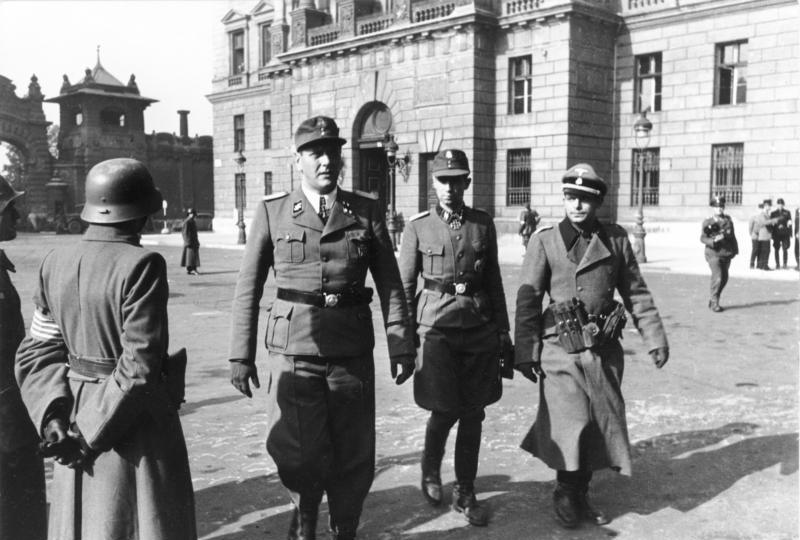
Otto Skorzeny (left) and the former Brandenburger Adrian von Fölkersam (middle) now with Skorzeny's SS-Jagdverbände in Budapest after Operation Panzerfaust, 16 October 1944

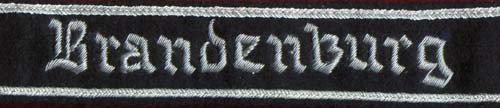
Cuff title of the Division „Brandenburg“, worn on the lower right sleeve from 1944 onwards

The night before the invasion of Poland (Plan White) in September 1939, small groups of German special forces dressed in civilian clothes crossed the Polish border to seize key strategic points before dawn on the day of the invasion. This made them the first special operations unit to see action in the Second World War. (Note: By no means was the Brandenburg Division the only German special operations unit of the Second World War, as they also had Otto Skorzeny's Friedenthaler Jagdverbände (which rescued Mussolini) and the Airborne Kampfgeschwader 200.) Freikorps Ebbinghaus engaged in atrocities against Poland's population and its captured PoWs. On 4 September, members of the Freikorps Ebbinghaus executed 17 people at Pszczyna, among them Boy Scouts from the town's secondary schools. They also tortured 29 citizens of Orzesze before executing them. (Note: See: The fate of Polish children during the last war by Roman Hrabar, Zofia Tokarz, Jacek Edward Wilczur, Rada Ochrony Pomników Walki i Męczeństwa (Poland) Interpress, 1981; Rocznik przemyski – Volume 21 – p. 130, Towarzystwo Przyjaciół Nauk w Przemyślu, p. 130 (1982); A więc wojna":ludność cywilna we wrześniu 1939 r. Anna Piekarska, Instytut Pamieci Narodowej (2009) Reviews Instytut Pamięci Narodowej, p. 21.) On 8 September 1939, in the upper Silesian city of Siemanowice, they executed six Poles and then on 1 October 1939, shot 18 people in Nowy Bytom. Larger massacres were carried out in Katowice, where hundreds of people were executed. Within two weeks of the invasion of Poland, Ebbinghaus had "left a trail of murder in more than thirteen Polish towns and villages".

On 15 December 1939, the company was expanded and re-designated as the Brandenburg Battalion. After its formation, the soldiers of the new special unit were initially employed to protect the Romanian oil fields and later chrome ore supplies from Turkey. The battalion consisted of four companies, organised along linguistic lines:

- 1st company - men from Baltic/Russian territories
- 2nd company - Volksdeutsche from Romania;
- 3rd company - Sudeten Germans who spoke Czech, Slovak, and Ruthenian
- 4th company - Volksdeutsche from Yugoslavia

In addition, the battalion contained volunteers who had lived in Belarus, Russia, and Ukraine. (Note: The battalion also included motorcycle and paratroop platoons.)

A platoon of Brandenburgers took part in Operation Weserübung, the invasion of Scandinavia in April 1940, during which they secured strategic properties in Denmark and Norway.

During the spring 1940 invasions of Belgium and the Netherlands, the Brandenburg units proved essential in seizing "vital points ahead of Guderian's panzers." Chronicling Brandenburger No. 3 Company's penetration into Belgium, Lahousen was gratified to report that, "forty-two out of sixty-one objectives were secured and handed over to the units following behind." For their exploits in Belgium and the Netherlands, the Brandenburgers were among the most decorated units of the invading German armies, which earned them the admiration of Abwehr Chief, Wilhelm Canaris. On 27 May 1940, chief-of-staff of the High Command of the German armed forces Wilhelm Keitel wrote to Canaris that the Brandenburgers had "fought outstandingly well" which was further validated when Hitler presented Iron Cross commendations to 75% of the 600 men who participated. By October 1940, the Brandenburgers constituted an entire regiment-sized unit. The rest of the Brandenburgers were assigned to Panzer Corps Grossdeutschland along with its old training partner from 1940 to 1941, the Grossdeutschland Division.

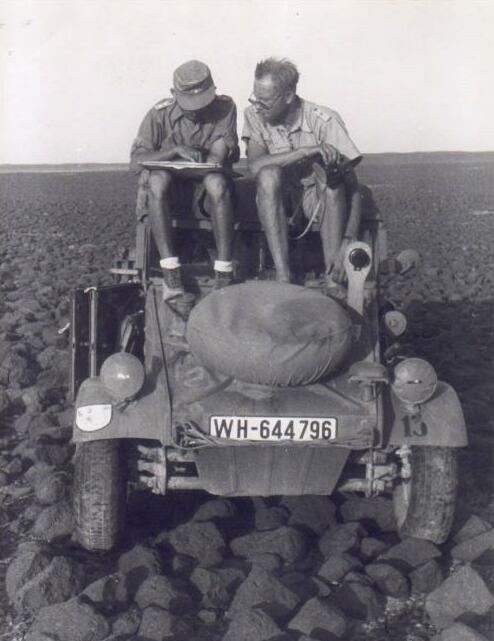
June 1942, a first lieutenant (Oberleutnant) and another officer from the Operation Dora special task force of the Brandenburger special forces study a map on a Volkswagen Kübelwagen in the South Sahara desert, on the western edge of the Basalt-Hamada landscape, which is impassable by truck. Launched in January 1941, Operation Dora, a German military geoscientific reconnaissance, aimed to update terrain information and reconnoiter the frontier between Libya and Chad.

The unit was again deployed in Operation Marita, the invasion of the Balkans. On 6 April 1941, during Operation Marita, the Brandenburgers managed to take the strategically important bridge over the Vardar and also secured the gorge on the River Danube which forms part of the boundary between Serbia and Romania, known as the Iron Gates. Shortly after this, they captured the island of Euboea. Additional operations were demanded of the Brandenburgers during the opening phase for the June 1941 invasion of the Soviet Union, as they were the first to sweep across the border, destroying power facilities, cutting communication lines, spreading disinformation, and activating "sleeper" agents. Their most notable mission was taking the bridges over the Daugava in Daugavpils on 28 June 1941, during which members of the 8th Company of the Brandenburg Kommandos crossed the bridge in a commandeered Soviet truck, overpowered the guards and held the position for two hours against significant Soviet counterattacks. From June 1942 through February 1943, the Brandenburgers carried out commando operations against Allied supply lines in North Africa by way of clandestine missions in Egypt, Libya, and Tunisia.

In early August 1942, a Brandenburg unit of 62 Baltic and Sudeten Germans led by Adrian von Fölkersam penetrated farther into enemy territory than any other German unit. They had been ordered to seize and secure the vital Maikop oilfields. Driving Soviet trucks and disguised as NKVD men, Fölkersam's unit passed through the Soviet front lines and moved deep into hostile territory. The Brandenburgers ran into a large group of Red Army soldiers fleeing from the front. Fölkersam saw an opportunity to use them to the unit's advantage. By persuading them to return to the Soviet cause, he was able to join with them and move almost at will through the Soviet lines.

On 26 December 1942, the men of the Parachute Company of the Brandenburg Regiment were transported by gliders in an operation to destroy bridges and supply routes used by Allied forces in North Africa. It was a disaster: some of the gliders were shot down while flying over enemy lines and others were destroyed approaching their targets; most of the paratroopers were killed.

Units of the division were sent to the Balkans to engage in anti-partisan operations. (Note: It is an undisputed fact that units of the Brandenburg were used in guerrilla warfare. Covering long distances and violating the martial terms of Hague Convention, the Brandenburg Division was conceived as a special forces unit designed for the sake of partisan warfare. Brandenburgers participated in partisan war in the East, in some cases as a cover for the murder of minorities. Partisan warfare was nevertheless a deadly reality to the German authorities and was considered a military necessity. This does not detract in any way or excuse the commission of war crimes by members of the Brandenburg Commandos at the local level by individual units or commands.)

In mid-1943, many Brandenburger units were moved from the Balkans and took part in actions to disarm Italian soldiers. One vital area was the island of Kos in the Dodecanese island chain off the coast of Turkey. Kos had been secured by British troops in September 1943, and a large garrison of allied Italian troops was also present. Along with Luftwaffe paratroop forces, Brandenburgers took part in the recapture of the island. On 25 May 1944, members of the division, attached to SS-Fallschirmjäger-Bataillon 500, took part in the unsuccessful Operation Rösselsprung, an airborne operation to capture Yugoslav Partisan leader Josip Broz Tito.

In September 1944 it was decided that special operations units were no longer necessary. The Brandenburg Division became the Infantry Division Brandenburg and transferred to the Eastern front. Approximately 1,800 men (including von Fölkersam) were transferred to SS-Standartenführer Otto Skorzeny's SS-Jäger-Bataillon 502 operating within SS-Jagdverband Mitte, but mostly to the SS-Jagdverband Ost until the end of the war. Only the Kurfürst Regiment retained its original role as a commando unit.

In late 1944, the division was equipped with a Panzer Regiment, redesignated Panzergrenadier-Division Brandenburg, and returned to the Eastern front. The Brandenburgers were involved in heavy fighting near Memel, until their withdrawal, along with the Großdeutschland, via ferry to Pillau. The division was all but annihilated in heavy fighting near Pillau, and only 800 men escaped to the thin strip of land at Frische Nehrung. While some survivors surrendered to British troops in Schleswig-Holstein in May, others enlisted in the French Foreign Legion and fought in the First Indochina War where their skills proved an asset. (Note: Due to the nature of their operations and the inherent hazards they faced, very few of them survived the war.)

== Sub-battalions ==
=== Bergmann Battalion ===
The Bergmann battalion (meaning "miner") was a military unit of the German Abwehr during World War II, composed of five German-officered companies of volunteers from the Caucasus region of the Soviet Union. The battalion was formed of the émigrés and Soviet POWs from the Caucasian republics at Neuhammer in October 1941. Subordinated to the German commando battalion Brandenburgers and placed under the command of Oberleutnant Theodor Oberländer, the unit received training at Neuhammer and Mittenwald (Bavaria) with the Gebirgsjäger. Later a special 130-men-strong Georgian contingent of Abwehr codenamed "Tamara-II" was incorporated into Bergmann. By March 1942, there were five companies of some 300 Germans and 900 Caucasians.

In August 1942, Bergmann went to the Eastern Front, where it saw its first action in the North Caucasus campaign in August 1942. The unit engaged in anti-partisan actions in the Mozdok-Nalchik-Mineralnye Vody area and conducted reconnaissance and subversion in the Grozny area. At the end of 1942, Bergmann conducted a successful sortie through the Soviet lines, bringing with them some 300 Red Army defectors, and covered the German retreat from the Caucasus. Bergmann went through a series of engagements with the Soviet partisans and regular forces in the Crimea in February 1943 and was dissolved—like other Ostlegionen units—at the end of 1943. The significantly shrunken ex-Bergmann companies were dispatched to conduct police functions in Greece and Poland.

=== Nachtigall and Roland Battalions ===
The Nachtigall Battalion, officially known as Special Group Nachtigall, and the Roland Battalion, officially known as Special Group Roland, were subunits under command of the Abwehr special operation unit Brandenburgers (1st Brandenberg Battalion). They were formed on 25 February 1941 by the head of the Abwehr Wilhelm Franz Canaris, which sanctioned the creation of the "Ukrainian Legion" under German command. They were manned primarily by citizens of occupied Poland of Ukrainian ethnicity directed to the unit by Bandera's OUN orders.

In May 1941, the German command decided to split a 700-strong Ukrainian Legion into two battalions: Nachtigall ("Nightingale") and Roland Battalion. Training for Nachtigall took place in Neuhammer near Schlessig. On the Ukrainian side, the commander was Roman Shukhevych and on the German, Theodor Oberländer. (Oberländer later became Federal Minister for Displaced Persons, Refugees, and War Victims in the Federal Republic of Germany.) Ex-Brandenburger Oberleutnant Hans-Albrecht Herzner was placed in military command of the Battalion. The Nachtigall unit wore standard Wehrmacht uniforms; before entering Lviv, they placed blue and yellow ribbons on their shoulders. The Roland Battalion wore Czechoslovak uniforms with yellow armband with text "Im Dienst der Deutschen Wehrmacht" (In the service of the German Wehrmacht). They were given Austrian helmets from World War I.

The battalion was set up by the Abwehr and organized by Richard Yary of the OUN(b) in March 1941, before the German invasion of the Soviet Union. Approximately 350 Bandera OUN followers were trained at the Abwehr training centre at the Seibersdorf under the command of the former Poland Army major Yevhen Pobiguschiy. In Germany, in November 1941 the Ukrainian personnel of the Legion were reorganized into the 201st Schutzmannschaft Battalion. It numbered 650 persons and served for one year in Belarus before disbanding. Many of its members, especially the commanding officers, went on to the Ukrainian Insurgent Army, and 14 of its members joined 14th Waffen Grenadier Division of the SS (1st Galician) SS-Freiwilligen-Schützen-Division Galizien in spring 1943. (Note: See: Боляновський А.В. Дивізія «Галичина»: історія — Львів:, 2000. (Bolyanovsky AV Division "Halychyna": History — Lviv, 2000))

== See also ==
- Battle of Velikiye Luki
- Special Staff F
- Operation Mammoth
- Robey Leibbrandt
- Kampfgeschwader 200
