= Anton Pace von Friedensberg =

Count Anton Pace, Baron von Friedensberg
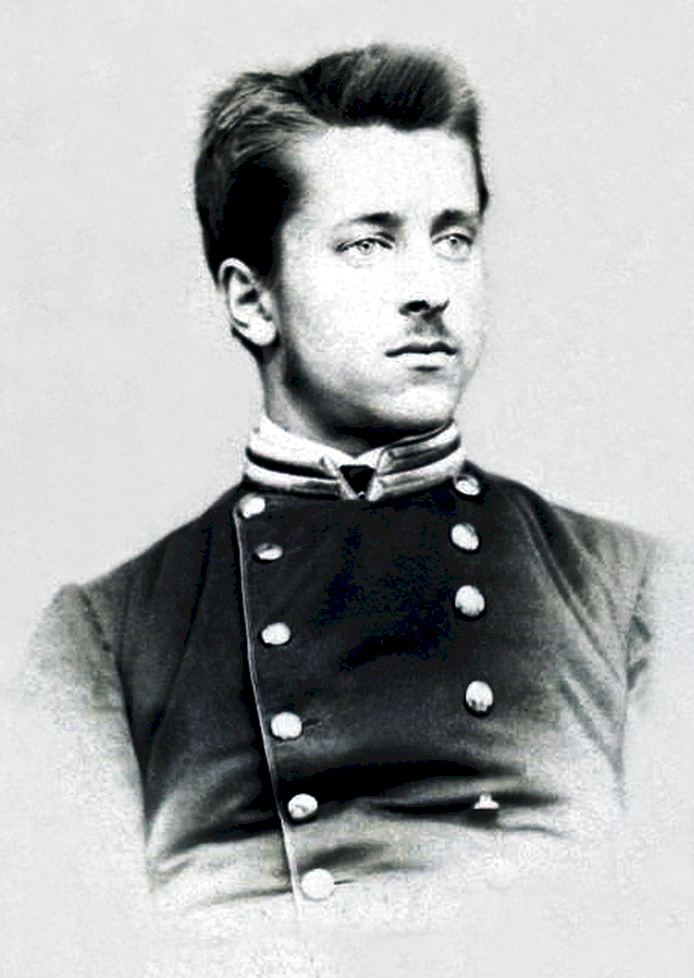

President of Bukovina
- In office 1 August 1891 – 17 May 1892
- Monarch: Franz Joseph I of Austria
- Preceded by: Baron Felix Pino von Friedenthal
- Succeeded by: Baron Franz von Krauß

Personal details
- Born: 14 November 1851 Heiligenkreuz am Waasen
- Died: 29 December 1923 (aged 72)
- Spouse: Baroness Marie von Winckler (m. 1883)
- Children: 2
- Education: University of Graz

Count Anton Pace, Baron of Friedensberg (Anton Graf Pace, Freiherr von Friedensberg in German; 14 November 1851 – 29 December 1923) was an Austrian aristocrat, politician, senior government official, and Imperial and Royal Privy Councilman. He served as the President of Bukovina and later as a life member of the Imperial Council of Austria-Hungary.

== Early life ==
Anton Pace von Friedensberg was born on 14 November 1851 at Burg Thurn-Gallenstein near Heiligenkreuz am Waasen. He was the son of Count Karl Maria Philipp Pace von Friedensberg (1821-1884) and his wife, Baroness Kamilla Schweiger von Lerchenfeld (1822-1899). He studied law at the University of Graz, graduating in 1870.

== Government career ==
In 1874 he entered the civil service and served as district captain of Loitsch. He then served as Ministerial Secretary in the Ministry of the Interior before being appointed Governor of Graz in 1888. In 1889 he was transferred to the Duchy of Bukovina where he served as a Geheimrat in the Aulic Council. On 2 August 1890 he took over the official business of the Duchy's president, Baron Felix Pino von Friedenthal, whose health was failing. He was made the successor for the position on 9 January 1891 and resumed the role of President of the Duchy of Bukovina, serving as the head of the state government, on 1 August 1891. Influenced by German and Polish social circles, Pace von Friedensberg restricted the use of the Romanian language in government administration and judicial proceedings. This caused controversy in the Duchy with the Romanian population and caused conflict with the Archbishop of Chernivtsi, Silvestru Morariu-Andrievici, who accused Pace von Friedensberg of defying ecclesiastical autonomy. In February 1892 the Romanian Conservative Party leader Baron Alexander Wassilko von Serecki, the Orthodox Patriarch of Bukovina, and many of the Bukovinian nobility refused to attend a festival hosted by Pace von Friedensberg in protest of his anti-Romanian leanings. Pace von Friedensberg was recalled on 17 May 1892. Although no longer the President of Bukovina, he was granted honorary citizenship by the Czernowitz city council.

Upon leaving office, Pace von Friedensberg was not honored with any decorations, unlike his predecessors, due to his lack of adversity in his administrative career. He was given a position as Vice President of the Supreme Court of Auditors in Vienna and was added to the Privy Council in 1897. He was decorated as a second class member of the Order of the Iron Crown in 1898 for his administrative work. In 1990 he became Section Chief to the Ministry of the Interior, where he remained until he retired in 1905. He was decorated with the Grand Cross of the Imperial Austrian Order of Franz Joseph in 1901.

On 27 December 1909 Pace von Friedensberg was appointed as a member of the Austrian Imperial Council for life and served as vice-president of the Commission for Legal Reform from 1911 until 1914.

Along with government work, Pace von Friedensberg was interested in Slovene culture and literature, having translated various works by France Prešeren from Slovenian to German.

Pace von Friedensberg was considered a leading expert in administrative law. He created a legal system for the Ministry of the Interior and revised Ernst Mayerhofer's Handbuch für die politische Verwaltungsdienst.

== Personal life ==
He was married to Baroness Marie von Winckler (1864-1905). They had:

- Count Karl Ludwig Pace von Friedensberg (1884-1907), unmarried
- Countess Melitta Maria Kamilla Pace von Friedensberg (1891-1941) ⚭ Count Wilhelm Rudolf Maria Pace von Friedensberg (1896-1957)
- Count Carlo Maria Alfred Pace von Friedensberg (1892-1961) ⚭ Baroness Margarete von Sochor Bezecny (1899-1995), had issue
