= List of governors of Bukovina =

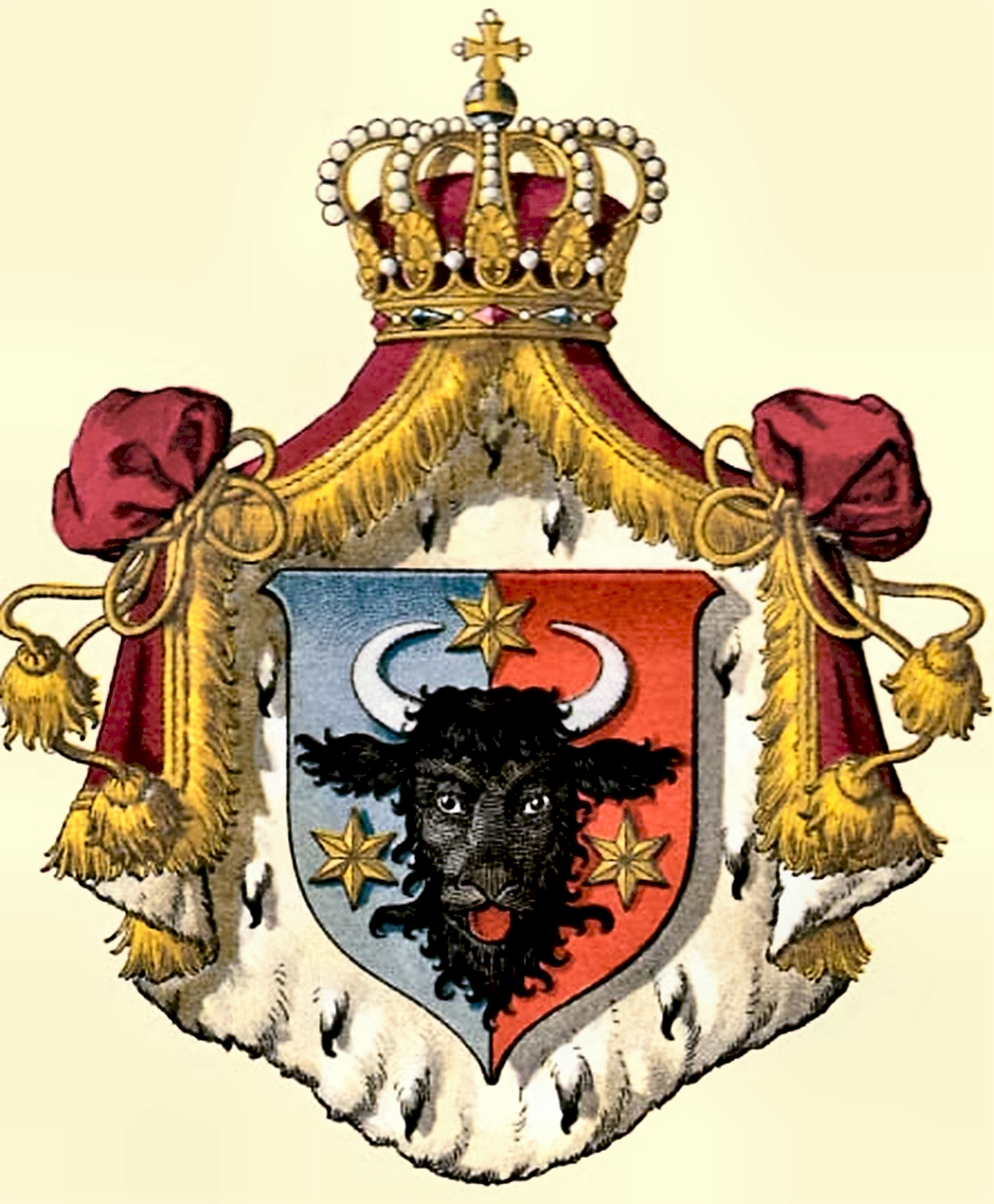
Coat of arms of the Duchy of Bukovina

This is the list of presidents of Bukovina, the district-governors (until 1849) and the administrators (until 1861).

The years 1849–1854 were, according to the declaration of independence of Bukovina, a transitional period, during which the former district office gradually passed over into an independent state government. It was not until 29 May 1854, one can speak of such.

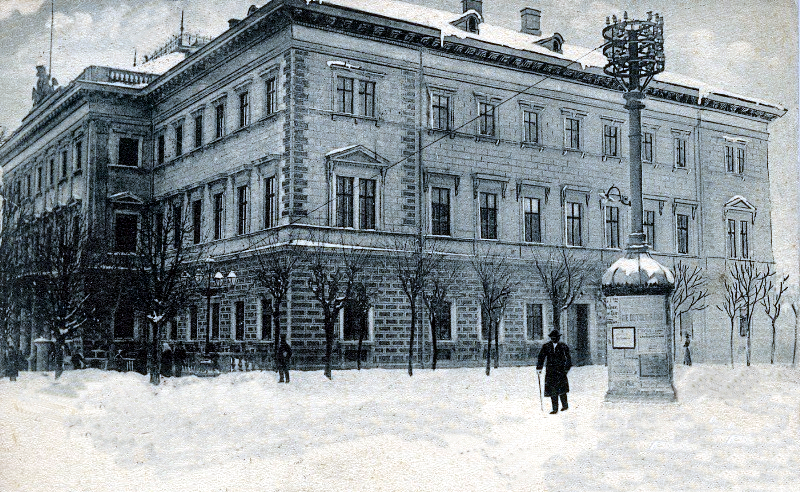
Seat of the government of Bucovina 1873–1905

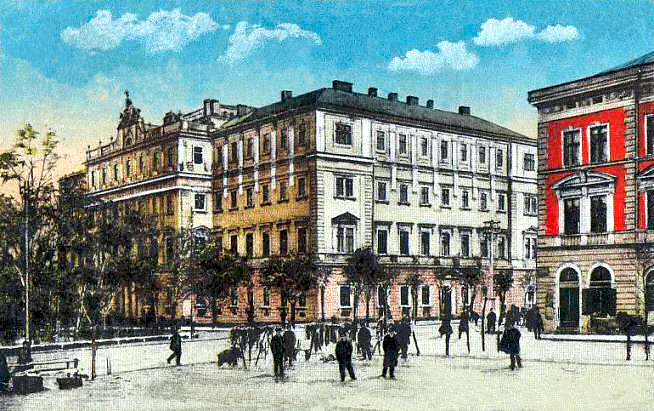
Seat of the government of Bucovina after 1905

- Gabriel Baron Splény von Miháldy, General (1774–6 April 1778)
- Karl Freiherr von Enzenberg, General (April 1778–31 October 1786)
- Joseph von Beck (1786–1792)
- Basil Freiherr von Balsch (1792–1803)
- Franz von Schreiber (1803–1805)
- Franz Adam Ritter von Mitscha (1805–1807)
- Johann von Platzer (1807–1817)
- Joseph Freiherr von Stutterheim (1817–1823)
- Johann von Melczechen (1823–1833)
- Frantz Kratter (1833–1838)
- Kasimir von Milbacher (1838–1840)
- Gheorghe Isăcescu (1840–1849)
- Eduard Ritter von Bach (February 1849–July 1849)
- Anton Freiherr Henniger von Seeberg (July 1849–1 March 1853)
- Franz Freiherr von Schmück (From 6 March 1853 provisionally President; 29 May 1854 – 27 November 1857 first independent President)
- Karl Graf von Rothkirch-Panthen (18 February 1857–May 1860)
- Jakob Ritter von Mikuli – Chef of the provisionally Government of Bukowina (1 September 1860 – 1 March 1861)
- Wenzel Ritter von Martina – erster Landespräsident des Herzogtums Bukowina (26 March 1861 – 2 May 1862)
- Rudolph Graf von Amadei (31 May 1862 – 30 October 1865)
- Franz Ritter Myrbach von Rheinfeld (30 October 1865 – 4 October 1870)
- Felix Freiherr Pino von Friedenthal (4 October 1870 – 8 July 1874)
- Hieronymus Freiherr von Alesani (18 August 1874 – 8 February 1887)
- Felix Freiherr Pino von Friedenthal (February 1887–1 August 1890)
- Anton Graf Pace von Friedensberg (first from 9 January 1891 Head of Government, 1 August 1891 – 17 May 1892)
- Franz Freiherr von Krauß (22 May 1892 – 13 June 1894)
- Leopold Graf von Goëss (15 November 1894 – 16 December 1897)
- Friedrich Freiherr Bourguignon von Baumberg (16 December 1897 – 27 February 1903)
- Prinz Konrad zu Hohenlohe-Schillingsfürst (28 February 1903 – 1 October 1904)
- Oktavian Freiherr Regner von Bleyleben (1 October 1904 – 15 December 1911)
- Rudolf Graf von Meran (1 January 1912 – 31 December 1916)
- Josef Graf von Ezdorf (1 May 1917 – 5 November 1918)

The last president of the Duchy, Joseph Graf von Etzdorf, could practically not perform his duties due to the war. He also had to change constantly his official residence: Vatra Dornei, then Cluj, Prague, Stanislau and at last Cernăuți.

== Gallery ==
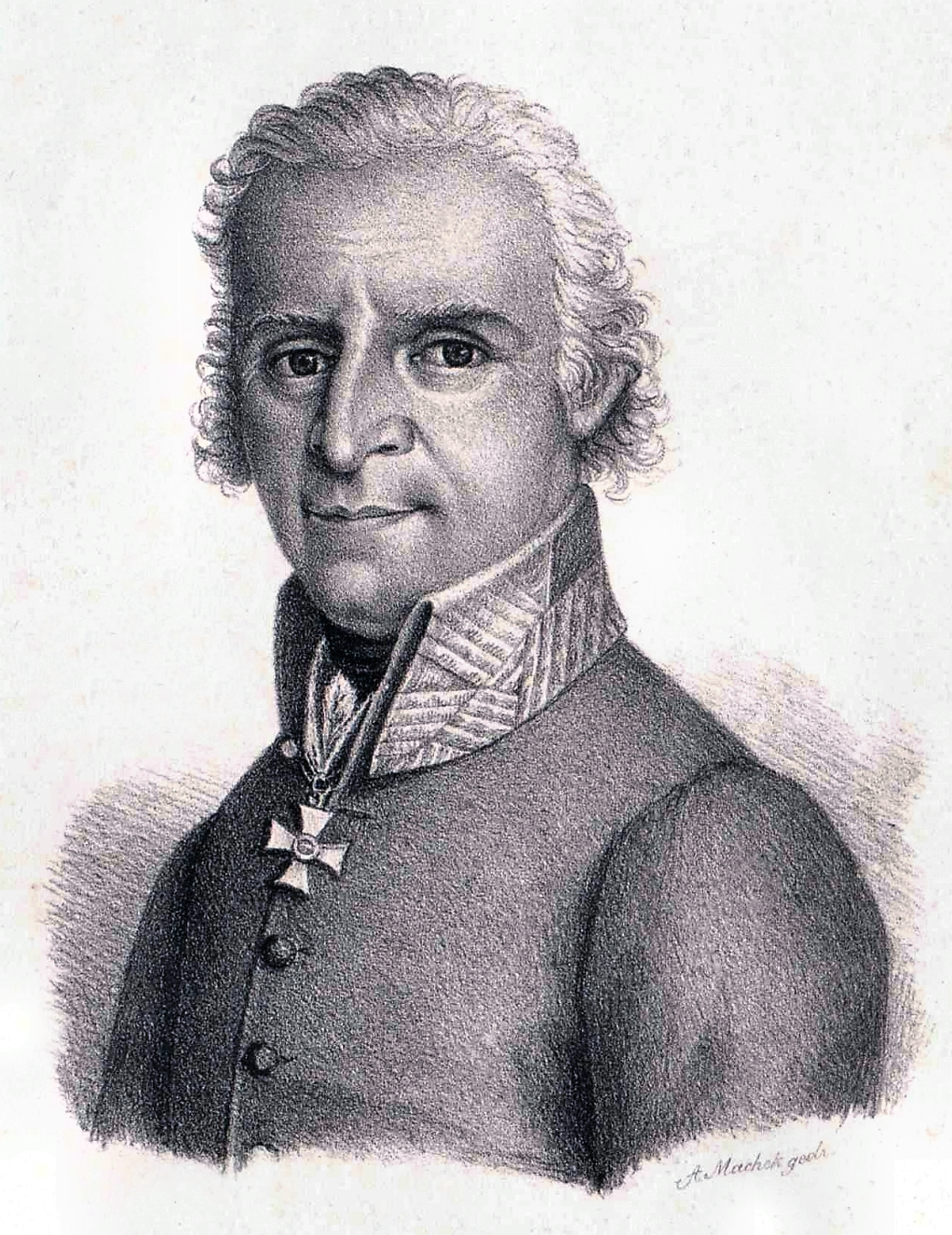
Gabriel Splény von Miháldy

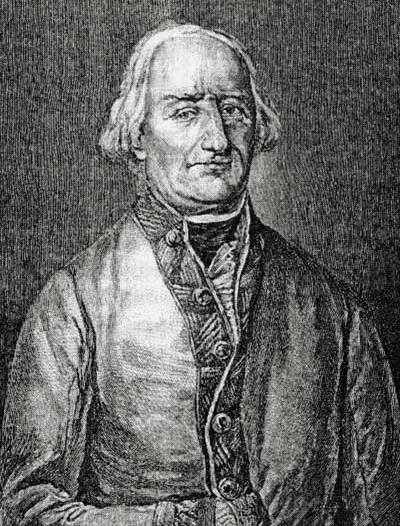
Karl von Enzenberg

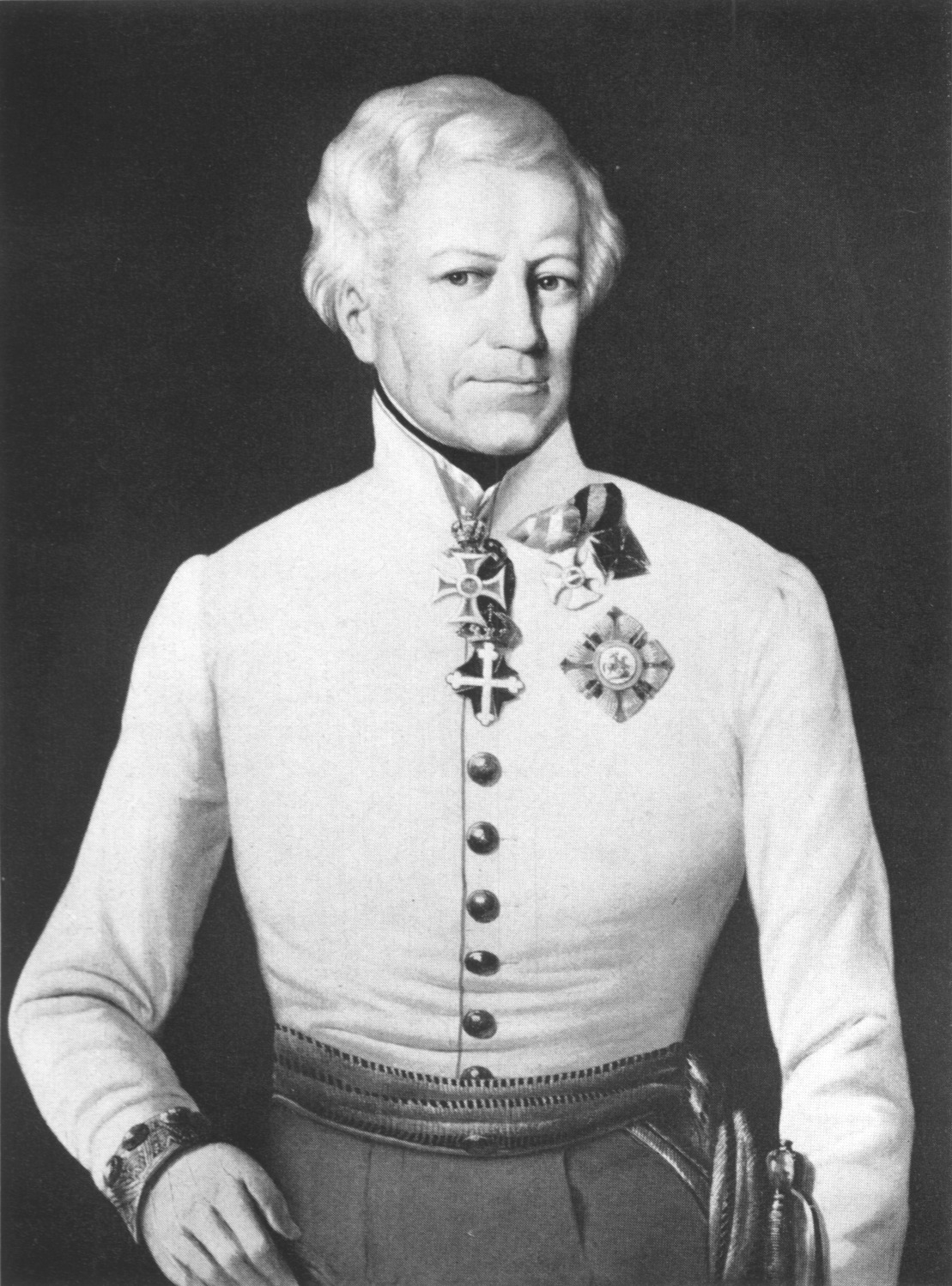
Joseph von Stutterheim

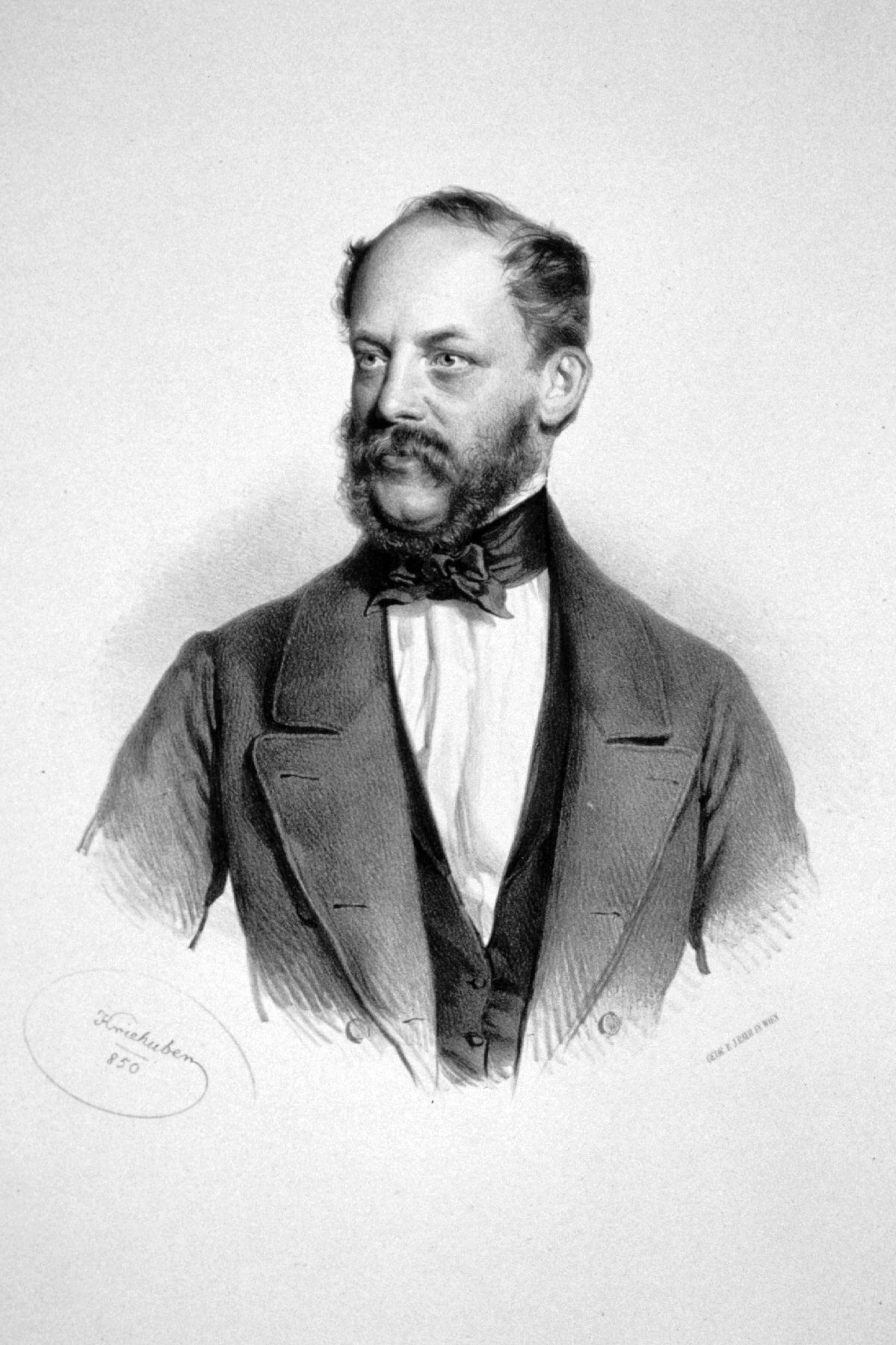
Eduard von Bach

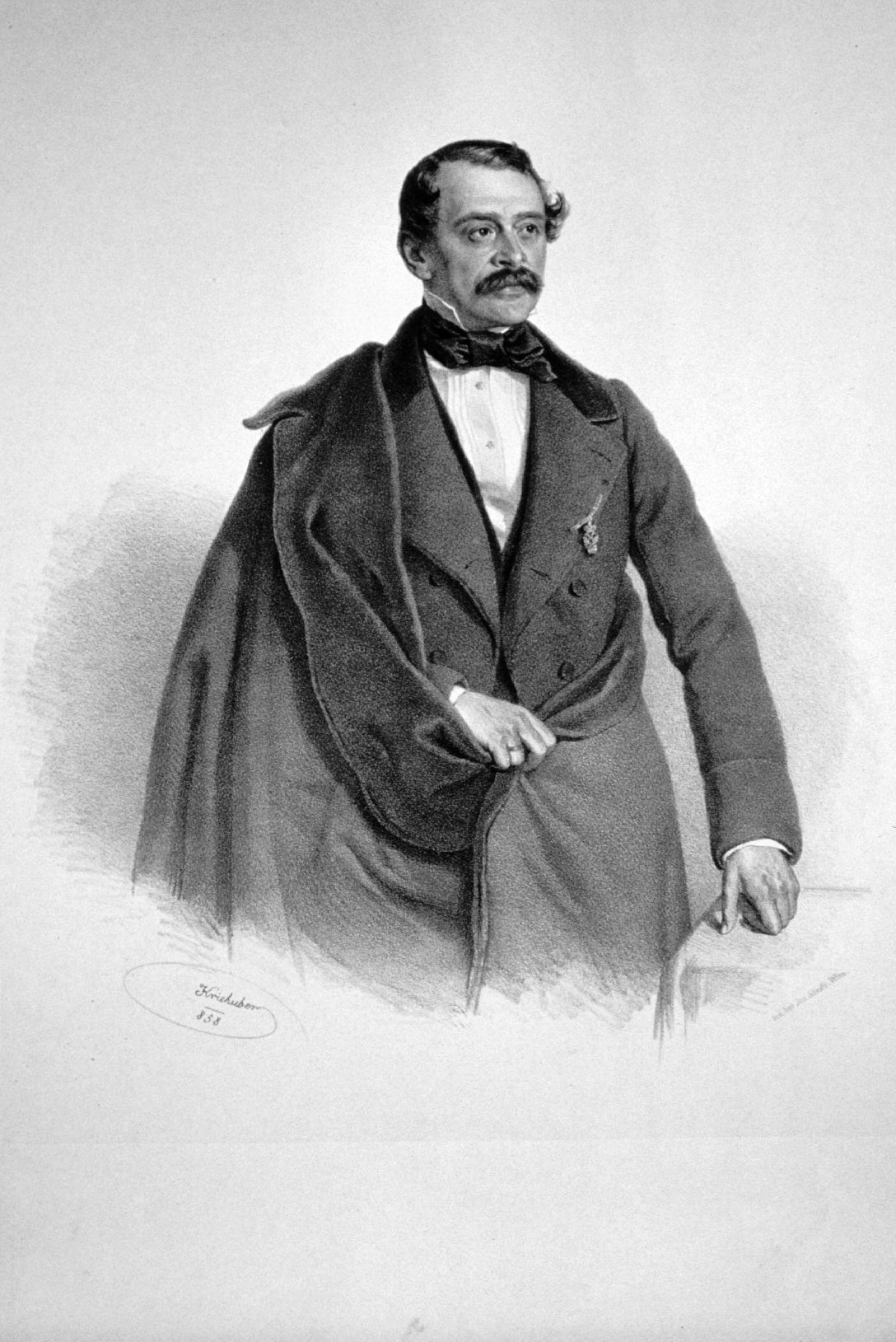
Karl von Rothkirch und Panthen

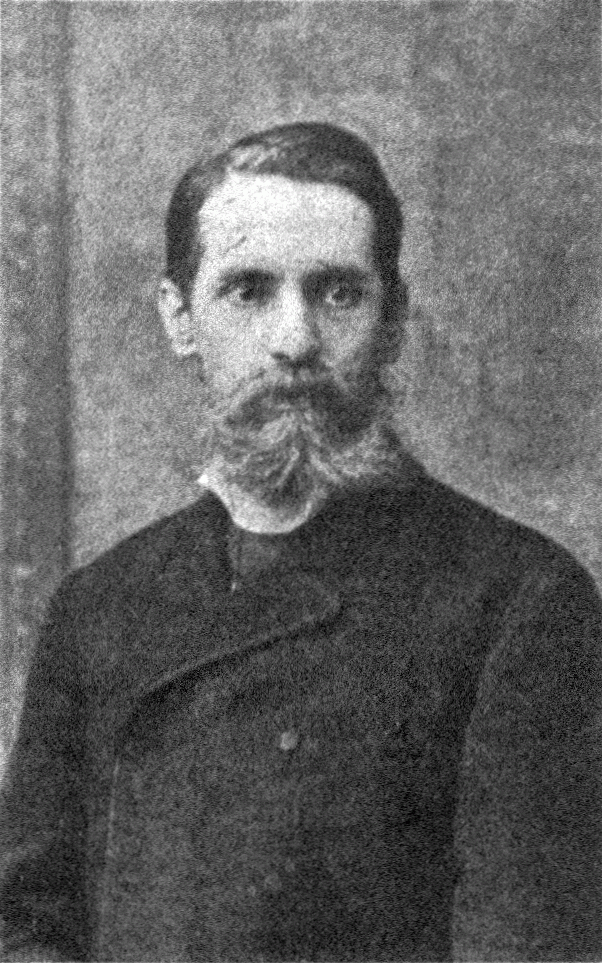
Felix Pino von Friedenthal

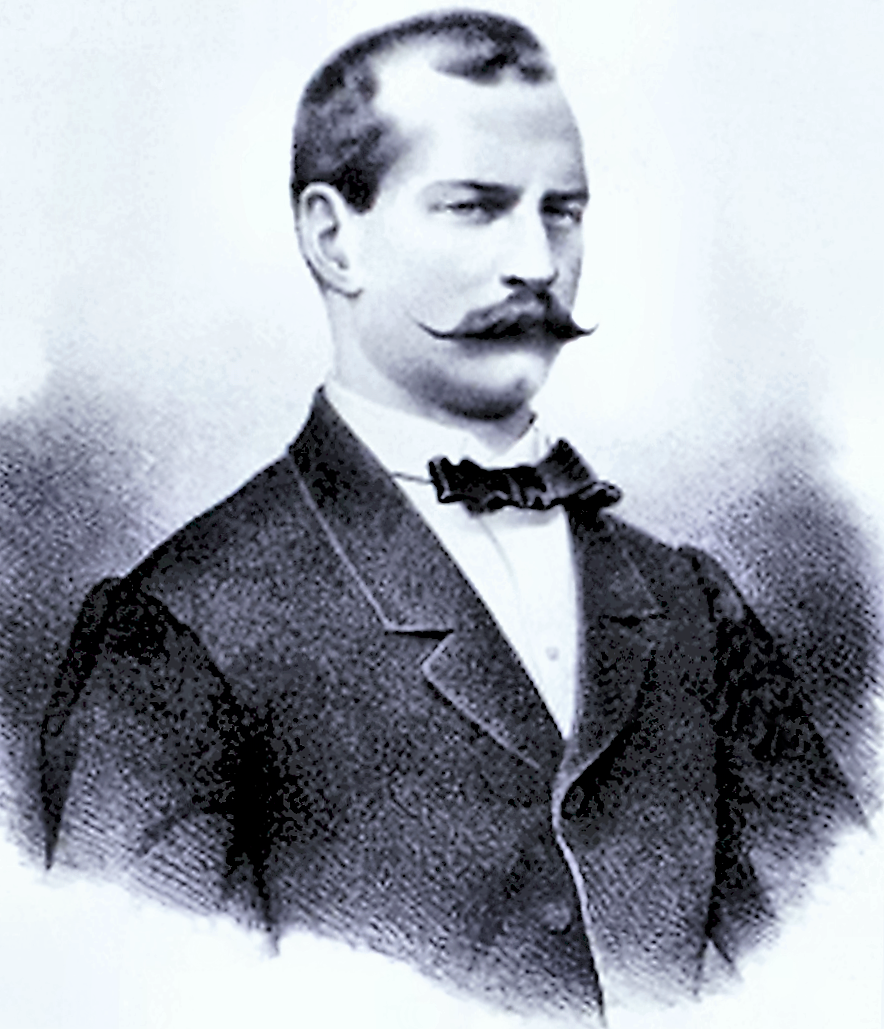
Hieronymus von Alesani

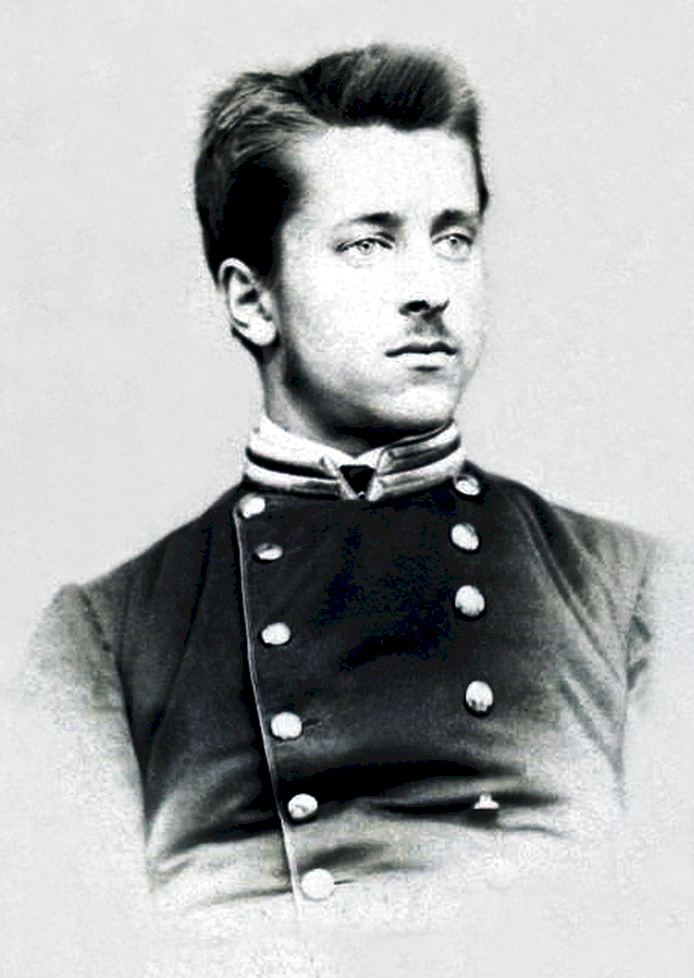
Anton Pace von Friedensberg

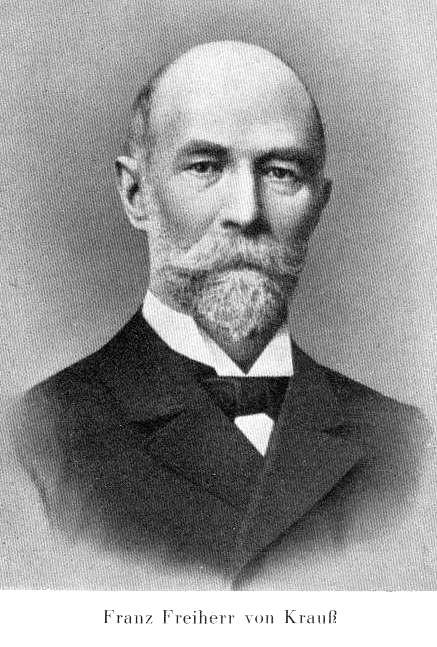
Franz von Krauß

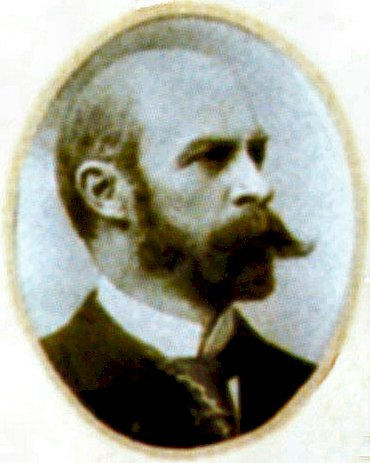
Leopold von Goess

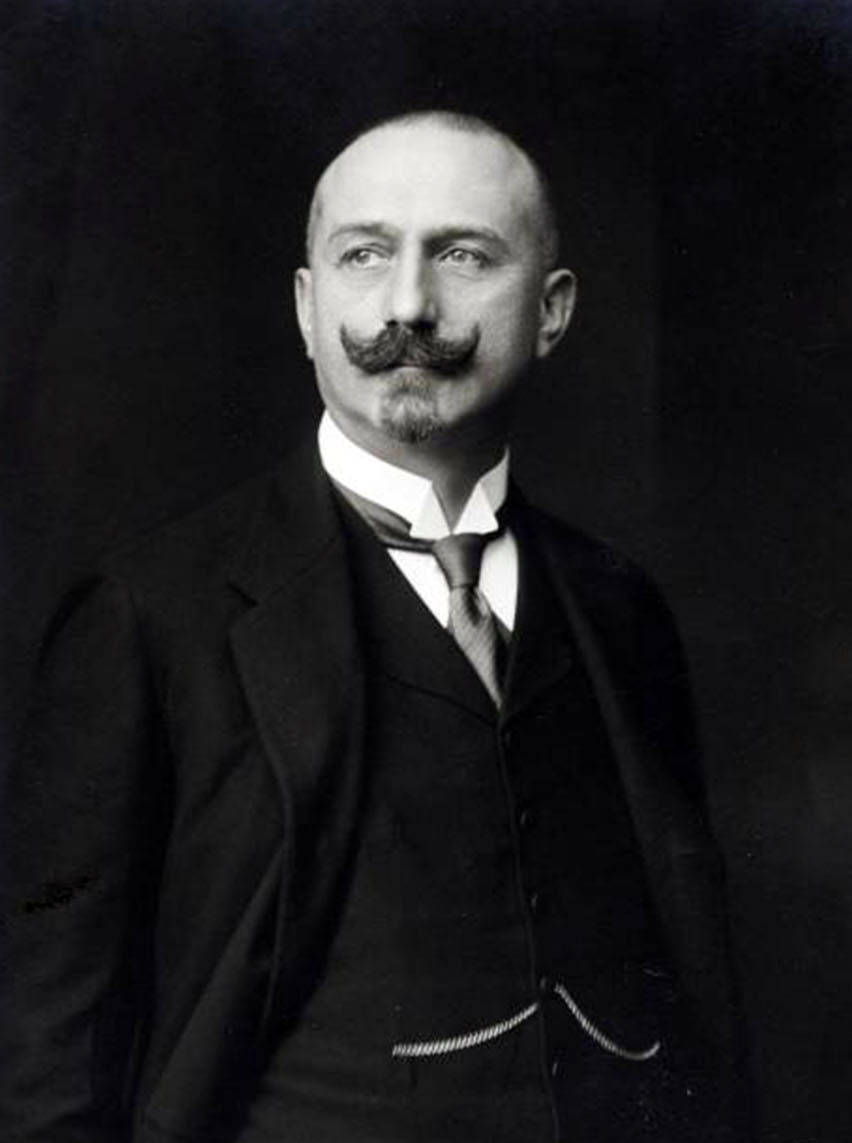
Konrad von Hohenlohe-Schillingsfürst

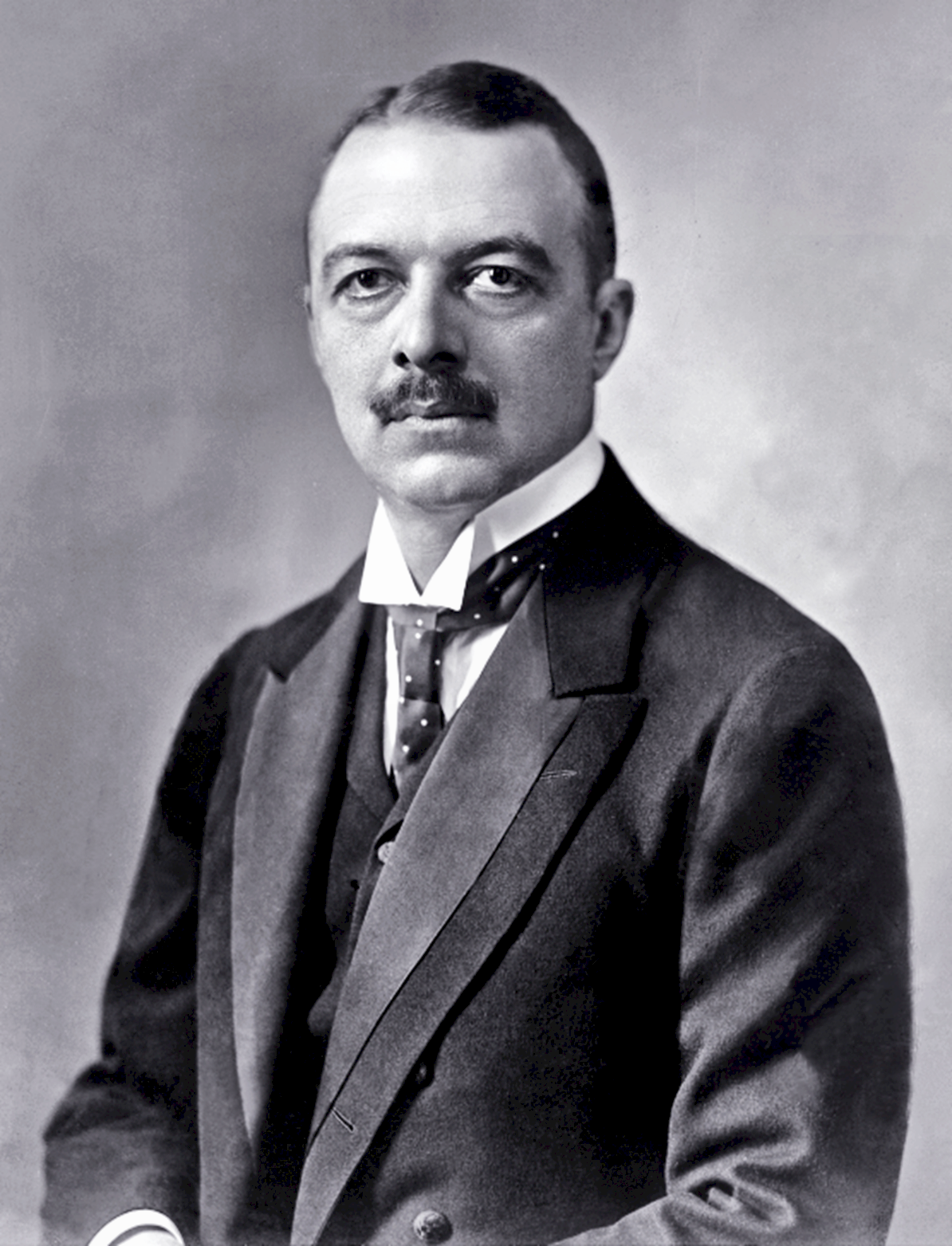
Oktavian von Bleyleben

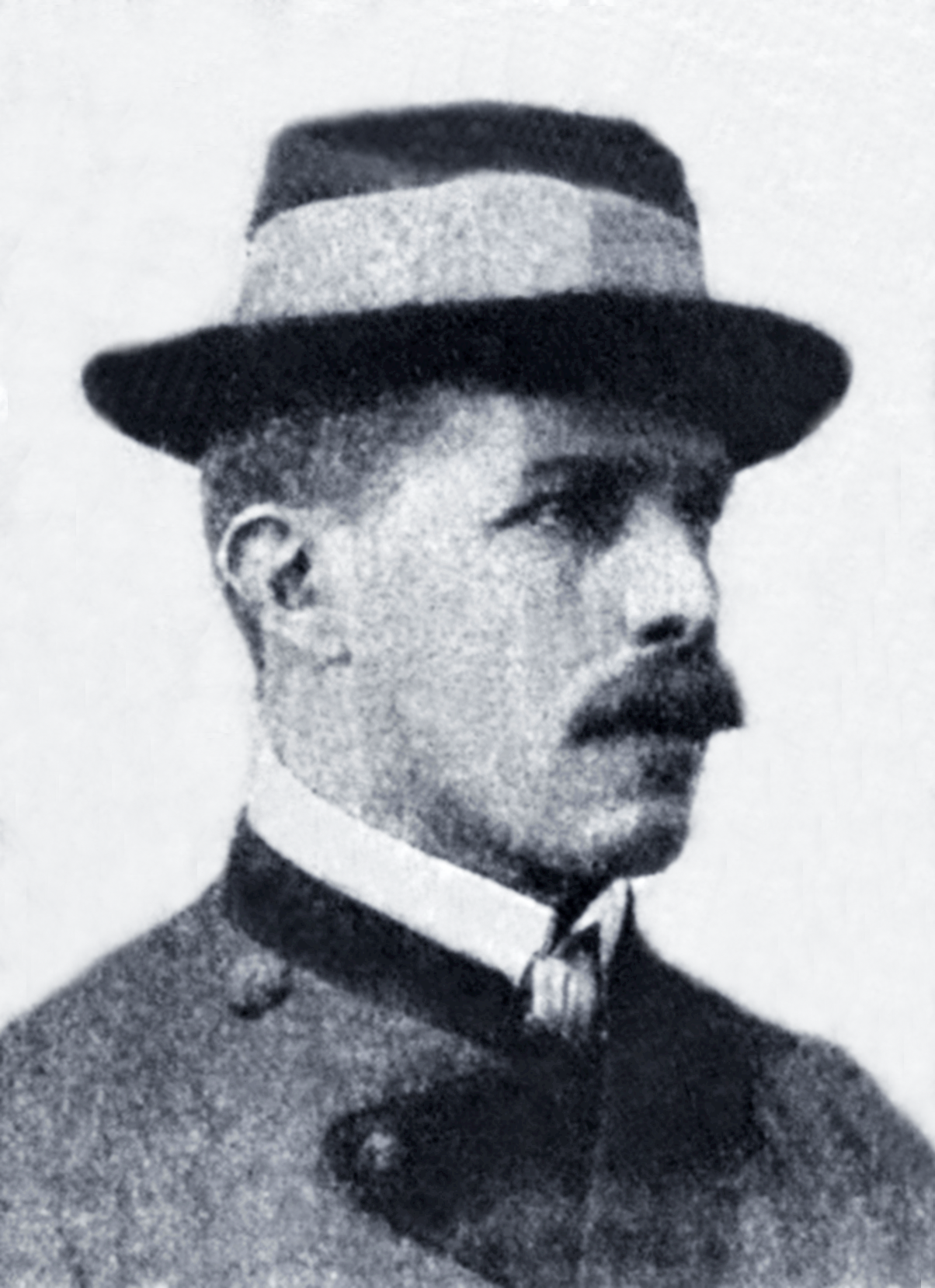
Rudolf von Meran
