= Adrian von Fölkersam =

German Brandenburger and Waffen-SS officer in World War II

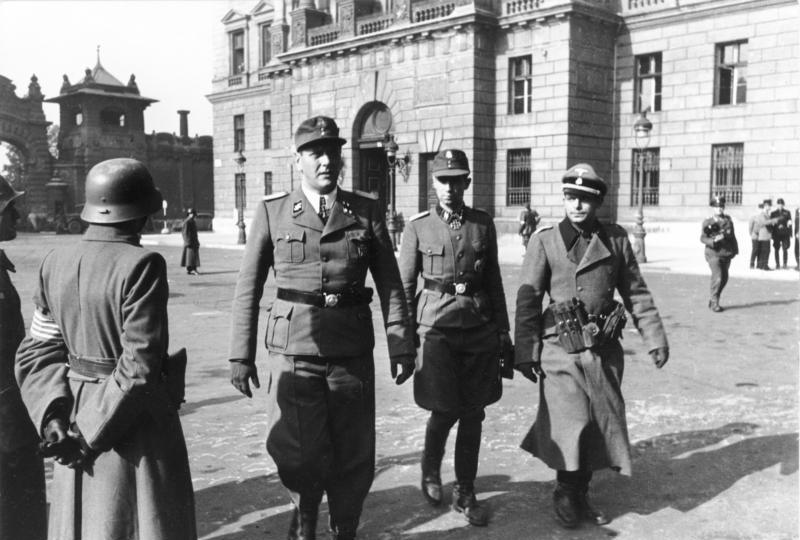
- Otto Skorzeny (left), Adrian von Fölkersam (middle) and SS-Obersturmführer Walter Girg (right) in Budapest in 1944
- Born: 20 December 1914; Petrograd, Russian Empire
- Died: 21 January 1945 (aged 30); Hohensalza, Poland
- Military career
- Allegiance: Nazi Germany
- Service years: 1940–1945
- Rank: SS-Sturmbannführer
- Conflicts: World War II; Western Front; Battle of the Bulge; Operation Greif; Eastern Front; Operation Panzerfaust
- Awards: Knight's Cross of the Iron Cross

Adrian Freiherr von Fölkersam 20 December 1914 – 21 January 1945) was a German Brandenburger and Waffen-SS officer in World War II.

== Career ==
Fölkersam was born into an aristocratic Baltic German family with a long record of service to the Russian Empire. Fölkersam's family fled Russia after the Russian Revolution and settled in Latvia. From 1934 he attended university in Munich, Königsberg and Vienna studying economics, at this time he became a member of the National Socialist movement and the SA. Fölkersam joined the Brandenburgers in May 1940, forming a special unit comprising Volksdeutsche (ethnic Germans) of Russian origin. His unit was active extensively during Operation Barbarossa, and he even led an operation to capture the Maikop oilfields with his men dressed as an NKVD detachment.

In 1944 Fölkersam's unit transferred to the Waffen-SS and became the major part of SS-Jagdverband Ost. This unit was active on the Eastern Front and took part in the kidnapping of Miklós Horthy Jr. and the deposition of his father, the Hungarian regent Miklós Horthy in Operation Panzerfaust. During the Battle of the Bulge, Fölkersam participated in Operation Greif, and worked in close coordination with Otto Skorzeny. In January 1945, having been posted to the Eastern Front, he fought against the advancing Red Army in central Poland. Adrian von Fölkersam was killed in action on 21 January 1945 near Inowrocław, Poland. At the time of his death, he was an SS-Hauptsturmführer (captain), and was in command of the SS-Jagdverband Ost.

== Awards ==
- Iron Cross (1939) 2nd and 1st Class
- Infantry Assault Badge
- Knight's Cross of the Iron Cross on 14 September 1942 as Leutnant der Reserve and adjutant in the Stab of the I./Lehr-Regiment z.b.V. 800 "Brandenburg"
