= Theodor von Hippel =

German Army intelligence officer

- Born: 19 January 1890; Thorn, Province of West Prussia, German Empire present-day Toruń, Poland
- Died: 1 January 1977 (aged 86); Kiel, West Germany
- Military career
- Allegiance: German Empire; Weimar Republic (to 1933); Nazi Germany
- Branch: Army (Wehrmacht)
- Service years: 1914–1918; 1935–1943
- Rank: Oberstleutnant
- Commands: Lehr-Regiment Brandenburg z.b.V. 800
- Conflicts: World War I: East African campaign; World War II: Invasion of Poland; Battle of France; North African Campaign (POW)
- Awards: Iron Cross 1st Class

Theodor-Gottlieb von Hippel (19 January 1890 – 1 January 1977) was the German Army and intelligence officer responsible for the formation and training of the Brandenburgers commando unit.

== World War I and interwar period ==
On October 18, 1914, shortly after the outbreak of the First World War, Hippel volunteered for service in the Schutztruppe for German East Africa, where he served under General Paul von Lettow-Vorbeck in the East African theatre, where Lettow-Vorbeck had conducted a guerrilla campaign against Allied colonial troops. In 1922, Hippel earned a doctorate in state economics (Dr. rer. cam., Doktor der Staatswirtschaftskunde) from the University of Tübingen. Hippel reentered the army in 1935. On November 1, 1937, he was transferred to the German military intelligence service known as the Abwehr.

Inspired by the example of Lettow-Vorbeck, Hippel proposed that small units, trained in infiltration and sabotage and fluent in foreign languages, could operate behind enemy lines, wreaking havoc on the enemy’s command, communication and logistical chains. He approached the Reichswehr, where his unconventional idea was rejected. He then approached the commander of Abwehr, Admiral Wilhelm Canaris who accepted Hippel's idea. Hippel was assigned to "Section II", the Abwehr branch dealing with clandestine operations. Since the project was top secret, this unit was designated "Special Duty Training and Construction Company" (Lehr- und Baukompanie) to mask its true function.

== World War II ==
The unit's first operation took part during the invasion of Poland. By mid-year, small teams of commandos had entered Poland to infiltrate key factories, mines and power stations. The X-Day for Case White was set for September 1.

On the evening of August 31, a team of the Brandenburgers infiltrated Danzig. At 4:17 local time, they surrounded and attempted to seize the city's post office. Simultaneously, the saboteur teams began to blow up their target facilities where they had been, up until then, employed. Meanwhile, other Brandenburgers slipped across the frontiers, infiltrated behind Polish defensive positions and seized crucial bridges across the river Vistula. Hippel was promoted to Oberstleutnant on June 1, 1941.

Although Bataillon Ebbinghaus was disbanded at the end of the invasion of Poland, it had performed well enough to be reconstituted, under its old Lehr- und Baukompanie codename, as a regiment for the 1940 invasion of France and the low countries. By this time, Admiral Canaris had begun to push Hippel aside and take a direct role in the Brandenburgers' operations himself. Hippel was sent to North Africa in February 1943, where he commanded a German-Arab unit in Tunis, surrendering to the Allied troops with the rest of the Axis forces in Tunisia in May 1943.

== Post-war life ==
Released from American custody in 1948, Hippel returned to Germany and in 1959 he was living in Emmingen ab Egg in Baden-Württemberg. He died on 1 January 1977 in Kiel at the age of 86.
