= Friedenthal =

Friedenthal (German: "peace valley") may refer to:

- Felix Pino von Friedenthal (1825–1906), Austrian civil servant and politician
- Karl Rudolf Friedenthal (1827–1890), Prussian statesman
- Markus Bär Friedenthal (1780/1–1859), Jewish merchant, landowner, writer
- Meelis Friedenthal (born 1973), Estonian writer
- Salomon Frenzel von Friedenthal (1560/64–1600), Silesian writer

== See also ==
- (Anglicized) Lloyd Fredendall (1883-1963), American general
