= Planina, Semič =

Planina Planina pod Mirno Goro
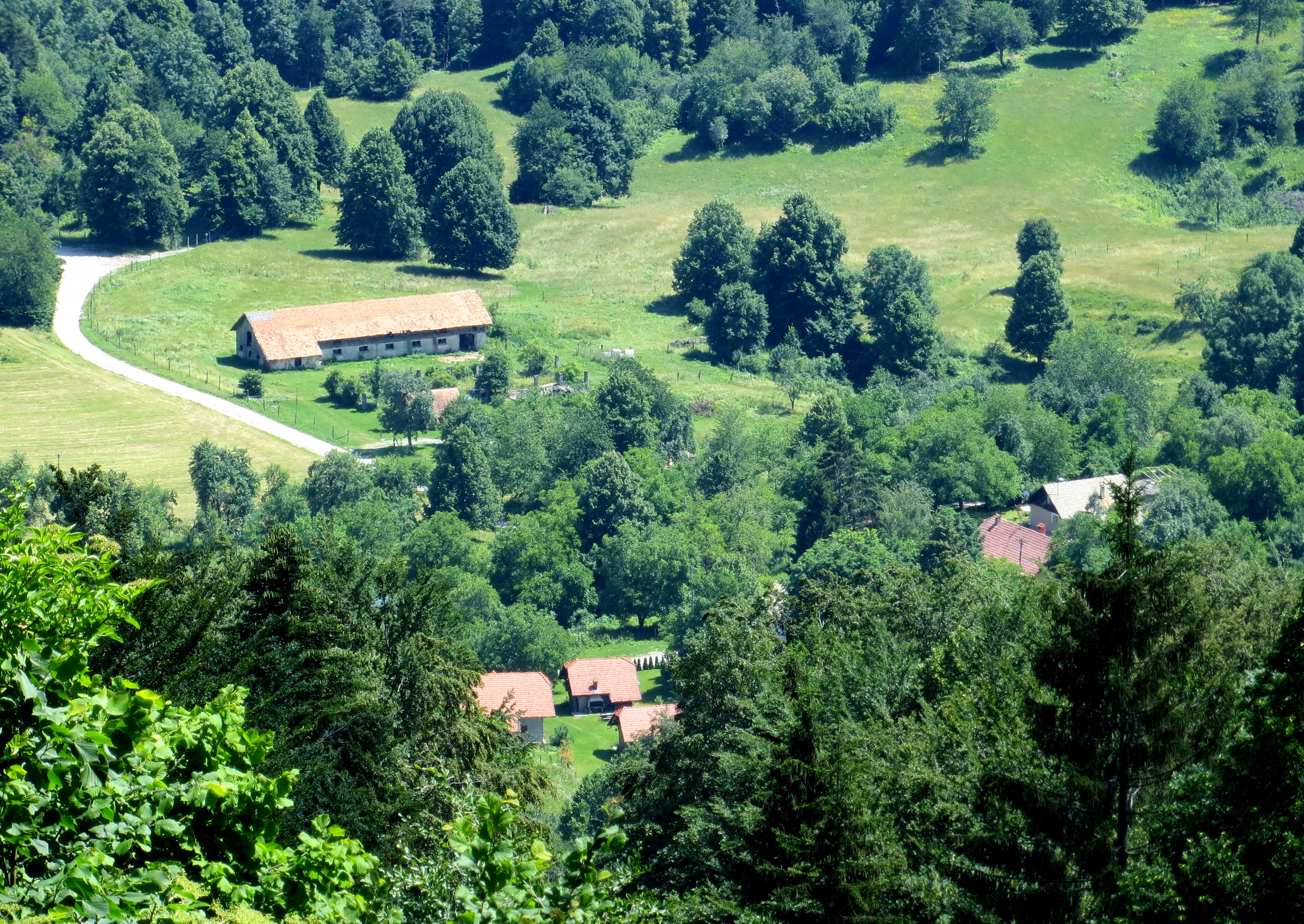

- Location in Slovenia
- Coordinates: 45°40′13.98″N 15°13′3.12″E
- Country: Slovenia
- Traditional region: Lower Carniola
- Statistical region: Southeast Slovenia
- Municipality: Semič

Area
  - Total: 32.22 km^{2} (12.44 sq mi)
- Elevation: 741.8 m (2,434 ft)

Population (2002)
  - Total: 95

Planina (pronounced [plaˈnìːna]; German: Stockendorf, Gottschee German: Aobə) is a village in the Municipality of Semič in Slovenia. It lies on the southern slopes of Mount Mirna (Slovene: Mirna gora) in the southern part of Kočevje Rog. It was inhabited by Gottschee Germans that were expelled in 1941 during the Second World War. The area is part of the historical region of Lower Carniola. The municipality is now included in the Southeast Slovenia Statistical Region.

== Name ==
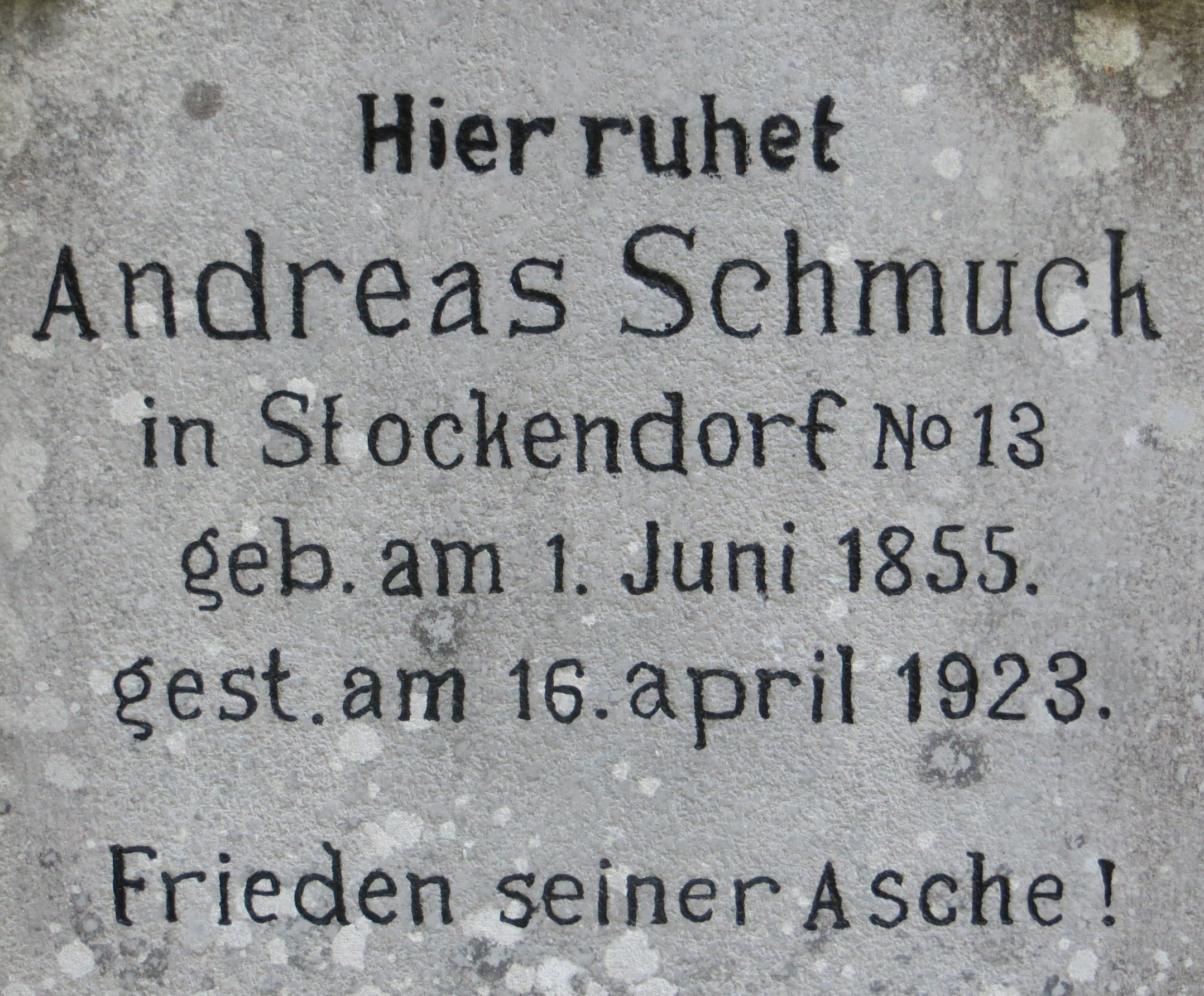
Gottschee German gravestone with the toponym Stockendorf

The name Planina comes from the Slovene common noun planina, referring to a mountain without trees or to a grassy mountain area used for grazing livestock. The longer name Planina pod Mirno Goro means 'Planina below Mount Mirna'. The German name of the settlement, Stockendorf, is a compound of Stock 'stump' and Dorf 'village', referring to a settlement at a site where land was cleared by burning and the stumps were then grubbed out. The Gottschee German name Aobə is the dialect form of the standard German noun Alpe 'mountain pasture' and semantically corresponds to the Slovene name Planina.

== Church ==
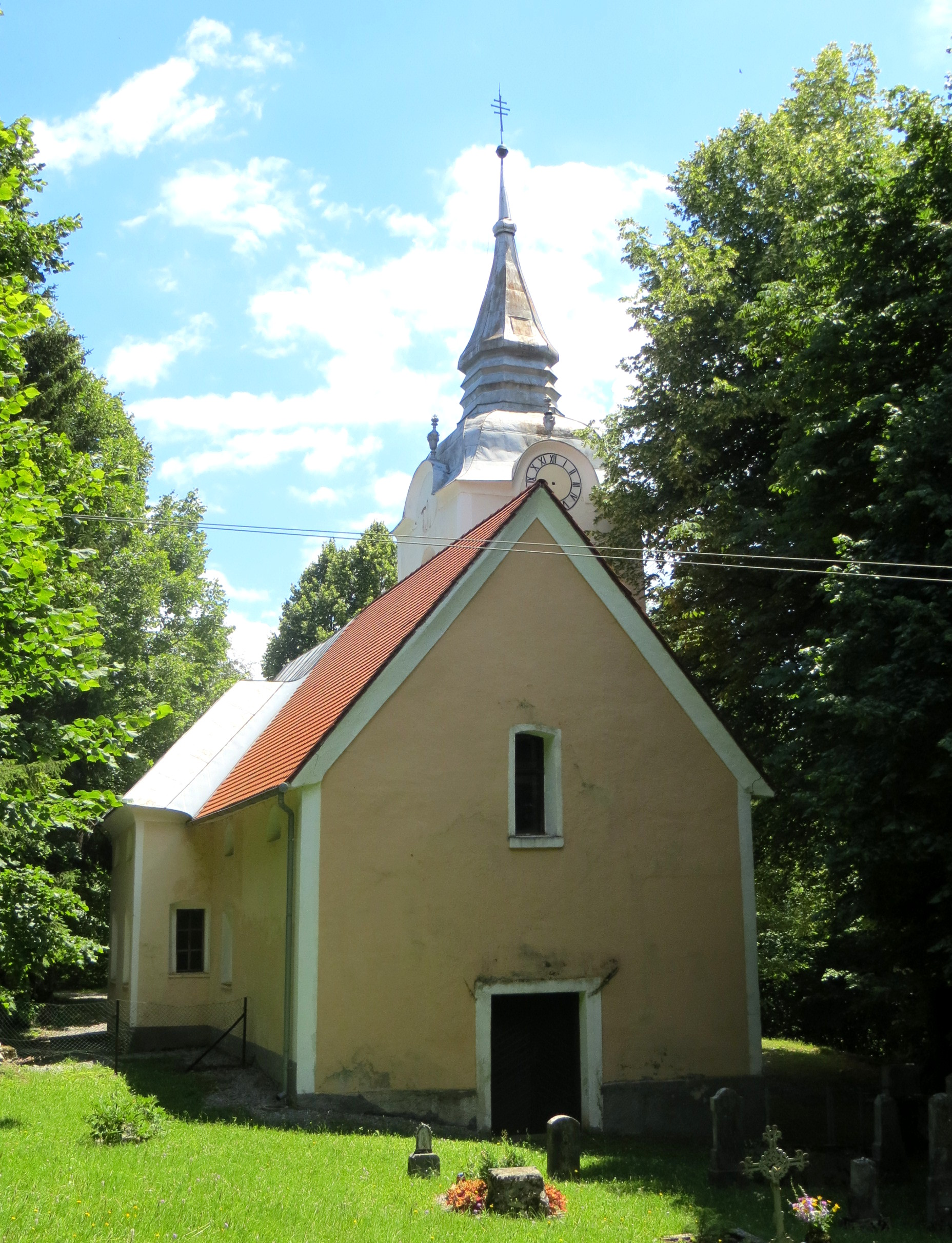
Prophet Elijah Church

The local parish church is dedicated to the Prophet Elijah and belongs to the Roman Catholic Diocese of Novo Mesto. It was built in around 1730 and extended in the late 18th century. It was renovated in the early 21st century.
