= Mount Mirna =

Mountain in the country of Slovenia

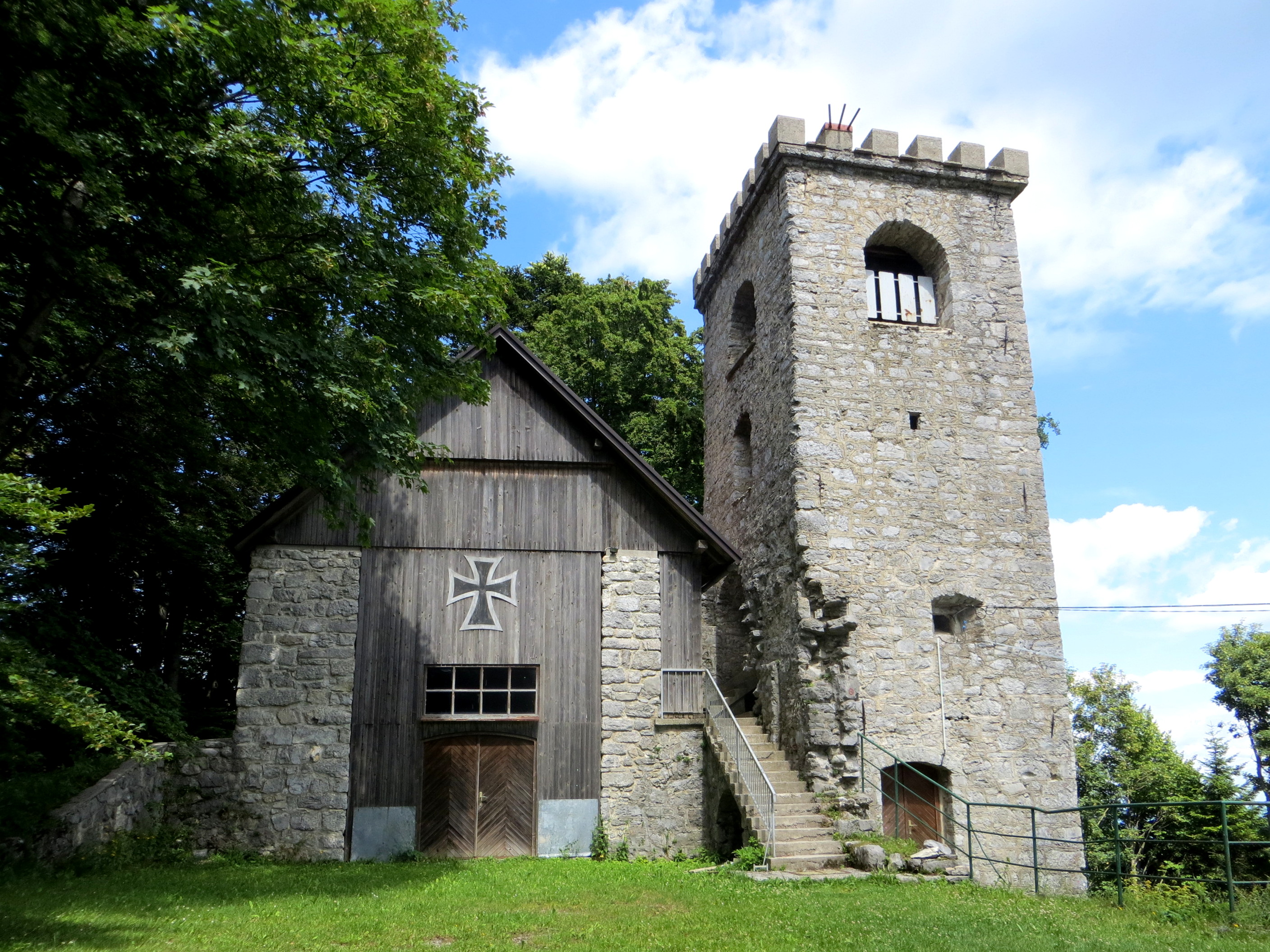
- Ruins of Saint Francis Xavier Church at the summit of Mount Mirna

Highest point
- Elevation: 1,042.7 m (3,421 ft)
- Coordinates: 45°37′56″N 15°5′39″E

Geography
- Location within Slovenia
- Location: Slovenia

Mount Mirna (Slovene: Mirna gora, German: Friedensberg, Friedbüchel), literally ‘peaceful mountain’, is a mountain in the eastern part of Kočevje Rog. It is located above the settlement of Planina and is the highest point in the traditional White Carniola region of Slovenia.

== Name ==
The name of the mountain was attested as Fridt Püchl (literally, 'peace mountain') in 1754. Traditional explanations of the name are connected with the function of the church that once stood there or the idea that it was spared from Ottoman attacks. However, like other Slovenian toponyms that seem to contain the adjective miren 'peaceful', it may also be derived from miren 'walled' (e.g., Miren) or through dissimilation from the verb *nyrati 'to arise from the ground' (e.g., the Mirna River or Mirna Peč).

== History ==
A church dedicated to Saint Francis Xavier, dating from 1793, formerly stood on Mount Mirna. It was a pilgrimage church where people prayed for storms to be turned away. The church was burned in 1942, and the bell tower is now used as a viewing platform.

== Recreation ==
Today Mount Mirna is a popular hiking destination. The Mount Mirna Lodge (Slovene: Planinski dom na Mirni gori) is located 10 m below the summit, and the summit itself offers good views of White Carniola and the Kolpa Valley.
