= Felix Pino von Friedenthal =

Austrian civil servant and politician

Felix Pino Freiherr von Friedenthal (14 October 1825, Vienna – 14 April 1906, Sankt Ruprecht, Kärnten) was an Austrian civil servant and politician.

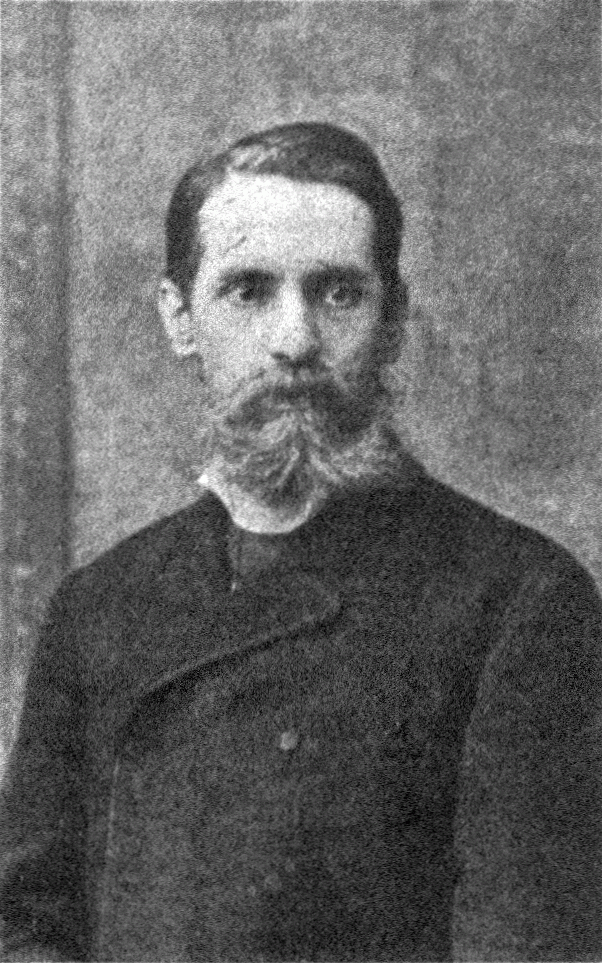
Felix Freiherr Pino von Friedenthal, photographed by Josef Löwy

== Life ==
Pino attended the Schottengymnasium and then from 1845 to 1848 studied jurisprudence at the University of Vienna. In 1849, he worked in government service and was at the Criminal Court of Graz and then was employed at the Zentralseebehörde in Trieste. From 1870 to 1874, and from 1887 to 1890 he was Landeschef of Bukovina.

He was, in 1870, a liberal deputy in the Landtag of Bukovina and in 1871, was elected to the Imperial Council. From 1874 to 1879, he was Stadtholder of Austrian Littoral (Istria, County of Gorizia and Gradisca, and Trieste), and from 1879 to 1881, was the governor of Upper Austria. From 1881 to 1886, he was the Handelsminister of Cisleithania in the Taaffe Cabinet, particular concerns were him while the organization of the state railways and the introduction of the BAWAG P.S.K.

== Literature ==
- W. Goldinger: "Pino von Friedenthal Felix Maria Frh.". In: Österreichisches Biographisches Lexikon 1815–1950 (ÖBL). Vol. 8, Austrian Academy of Sciences, Vienna 1983, ISBN 3-7001-0187-2, p. 84 f. (Direct links to "p. 84", "p. 85")
- Lothar Höbelt (2001). "Pino von Friedenthal, Felix Maria Freiherr". Neue Deutsche Biographie (in German). Vol. 20. Berlin: Duncker & Humblot. p. 456. (full text online).
