= N8 road (Belgium) =

Road in Belgium

Coordinates: 50.8765°N 2.8158°E

National Route 8
- Dutch: Nationale Weg 8 French: Route nationale 8
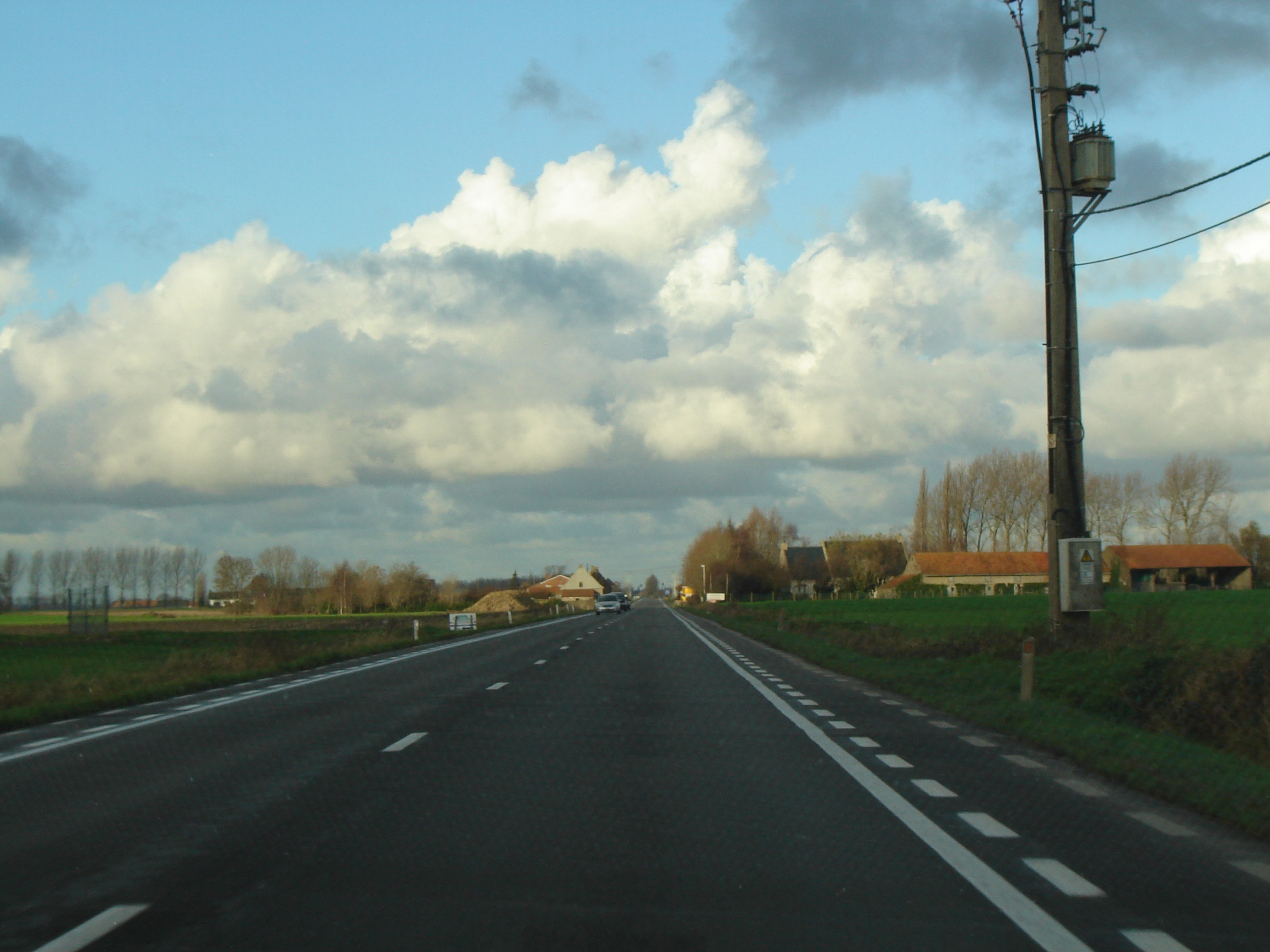
- The N8 near Alveringem

Route information
- Length: 152 km (94 mi)

Major junctions
- From: Brussels
- To: Koksijde

Location
- Country: Belgium
- Major cities: Brussels, Ninove, Oudenaarde, Kortrijk, Ieper

Highway system
- Highways of Belgium; Motorways; National Roads

The N8 road in Belgium is a road connecting Brussels and Koksijde, passing Ninove, Oudenaarde, Kortrijk, Ypres and Veurne.

== History ==
The N8 is the old road from Brussels to the coast. Most sections have been replaced by motorways, and only serve a regional purpose, except for the A19 which was supposed to go from Kortrijk to the coast, but which ends at Ypres. In 2012, the extension was permanently cancelled.

The road is one of the 9 major national routes in Belgium. The start is in the Belgian capital Brussels at the inner ring road. The road goes west, passing the Brussels Ring R0 in Dilbeek, where it enters the province of Flemish Brabant. Continuing further west, the road enters East Flanders near the midsized city Ninove. After passing the larger city of Oudenaarde and entering West Flanders, the N8 crosses the E17 highway at the major city Kortrijk. The road turns northwest to traverse the Westhoek region, passing the city of Ypres end ending at the coast in Koksijde. The N8 has a length of 152km (95mi).

== Route ==
The N8 crosses 28 municipalities. 3 in the Brussels Capital Region, 3 in Flemish Brabant, 9 in East Flanders and 13 in West Flanders. A full list of municipalities can be found below. Major municipalities are in bold.

Regions	Province	Municipality	Population	Length of N8 (km)
Brussels Capital Region	/	**City of Brussels**	188737	0.1
Brussels Capital Region	/	Molenbeek-Saint-Jean	97697	2.0
Brussels Capital Region	/	Anderlecht	122547	1.7
Flanders	Flemish Brabant	Dilbeek	44095	7.9
Flanders	Flemish Brabant	Lennik	9312	4.3
Flanders	Flemish Brabant	Roosdaal	11735	4.0
Flanders	East Flanders	**Ninove**	39626	11.5
Flanders	East Flanders	Herzele	18489	1.1
Flanders	East Flanders	**Geraardsbergen**	34328	3.3
Flanders	East Flanders	Lierde	6689	4.7
Flanders	East Flanders	Brakel	14850	7.9
Flanders	East Flanders	Horebeke	2023	2.3
Flanders	East Flanders	**Oudenaarde**	31866	11.3
Flanders	East Flanders	Maarkedal	6386	0.1
Flanders	East Flanders	Kluisbergen	6791	3.5
Flanders	West Flanders	Avelgem	10291	7.5
Flanders	West Flanders	Zwevegem	25140	10.5
Flanders	West Flanders	**Kortrijk**	77741	7.5
Flanders	West Flanders	Wevelgem	31565	5.9
Flanders	West Flanders	**Menen**	33982	3.7
Flanders	West Flanders	Wervik	19020	6.1
Flanders	West Flanders	Zonnebeke	12556	5.0
Flanders	West Flanders	**Ypres**	35039	14.9
Flanders	West Flanders	Vleteren	3217	7.7
Flanders	West Flanders	Lo-Reninge	3217	3.8
Flanders	West Flanders	Alveringem	5025	7.4
Flanders	West Flanders	Veurne	12295	8.6
Flanders	West Flanders	**Koksijde**	21851	3.3

== Junction list ==
Province	Municipality	Section	Junction	Eastbound destinations	Westbound destinations
(European Union) (Belgium) Brussels Capital Region	City of Brussels	Brussels - Anderlecht	Brussels (188.737 inh.) R20, Brussels inner ring road	Brussels	Dilbeek Ninove
(European Union) (Belgium) Brussels Capital Region	Molenbeek-Saint-Jean	Brussels - Anderlecht	Brussels-Charleroi Canal N215 Kuregem N274 Anderlecht N236 Ossegem, Molenbeek-Saint-Jean	Brussels	Dilbeek Ninove
(European Union) (Belgium) Brussels Capital Region	Anderlecht	Brussels - Anderlecht	N290 Molenbeek-Saint-Jean, Koekelberg, Jette, Wemmel, Anderlecht	Brussels	Dilbeek Ninove
(European Union) (Belgium) Brussels Capital Region	Molenbeek-Saint-Jean	Brussels - Anderlecht	/	Brussels	Dilbeek Ninove
(European Union) (Belgium) Flanders Flemish Brabant	Dilbeek	Dilbeek - Roosdaal	13 (Dilbeek) R0, Brussels Ring Waterloo, Brussels Airport, Liège (E40), Leuven (E40), Ghent (E40), Antwerp (E19), Charleroi (E19), Mons (E19), Namur (E411), Tournai (E429) Dilbeek (44.095 inh.) Itterbeek (4.882 inh.) Schepdaal (6.204 inh.) Goudveerdegem	Brussels	Ninove
(European Union) (Belgium) Flanders Flemish Brabant	Lennik	Dilbeek - Roosdaal	Eizeringen N285 Ternat, Asse, St-Kwintens-Lennik, Gooik, Enghien	Dilbeek Brussels	Ninove
(European Union) (Belgium) Flanders Flemish Brabant	Lennik / Roosdaal	Dilbeek - Roosdaal	The N8 forms the border between Lennik and Roosdaal. Tuitenberg (Lennik)	Dilbeek Brussels	Ninove
(European Union) (Belgium) Flanders Flemish Brabant	Roosdaal	Dilbeek - Roosdaal	Roosdaal (11.735 inh.)	Dilbeek Brussels	Ninove
(European Union) (Belgium) Flanders East Flanders	Ninove	Ninove	Meerbeke (5.890 inh.) N28 Aalst, Denderleeuw, Haaltert, Gooik, Halle N255 Denderwindeke, Herne, Enghien Dender Ninove (39.626 inh.) N405 Ninove-Noord, Aalst (N28), Denderleeuw (N28) Outer (3.302 inh.) N45 Appelterre-Eichem, Geraardsbergen Voorde (1.405 inh.) N460 Voorde, Idegem, Aspelare, Haaltert	Dilbeek Brussels	Oudenaarde
(European Union) (Belgium) Flanders East Flanders	Herzele	Ninove - Oudenaarde	/	Ninove Brussels	Oudenaarde
(European Union) (Belgium) Flanders East Flanders	Geraardsbergen	Ninove - Oudenaarde	Ophasselt (1.927 inh.) N42 Geraardsbergen, Zottegem, Ghent, Lessines, Ath	Ninove Brussels	Oudenaarde
(European Union) (Belgium) Flanders East Flanders	Lierde	Ninove - Oudenaarde	Sint-Maria-Lierde (2.530 inh.)	Ninove Brussels	Oudenaarde
(European Union) (Belgium) Flanders East Flanders	Brakel	Ninove - Oudenaarde	N8c Parike, Geraardsbergen N462 Michelbeke, Sint-Maria-Oudenhove, Zottegem Nederbrakel (6.428 inh.) N8c Parike, Geraardsbergen N48 Flobecq, Ronse, Tournai N415 Elst, Zwalm Zegelsem (962 inh.)	Ninove Brussels	Oudenaarde
(European Union) (Belgium) Flanders East Flanders	Horebeke	Ninove - Oudenaarde	N454 Schorisse, Ronse Sint-Maria-Horebeke (1.487 inh.) N454 Sint-Maria-Horebeke, Zwalm, Zottegem	GeraardsbergenNinove	Oudenaarde
(European Union) (Belgium) Flanders East Flanders	Oudenaarde	Oudenaarde	N441 Ename	GeraardsbergenNinove	Kortrijk
(European Union) (Belgium) Flanders East Flanders	Oudenaarde / Maarkedal	Oudenaarde	/	GeraardsbergenNinove	Kortrijk
(European Union) (Belgium) Flanders East Flanders	Oudenaarde	Oudenaarde	Edelare (1.901 inh.) Oudenaarde (31.866 inh.) N46 Ename, Zwalm, Zottegem, Aalst Leupegem (1.969 inh.) N60, Oudenaarde ring road Oudenaarde, Kruisem, Ghent, Maarkedal, Ronse Melden (940 inh.)	GeraardsbergenNinove	Kortrijk
(European Union) (Belgium) Flanders East Flanders	Kluisbergen	Kluisbergen	Meerse (282 inh.) Berchem (2.581 inh.) N36 Ruien, Ronse Scheldt	Oudenaarde Zottegem	Kortrijk
(European Union) (Belgium) Flanders West Flanders	Avelgem	Avelgem - Kortrijk	Kerkhove (1.017 inh.) N453 Elsegem, Petegem-aan-de-Schelde, Oudenaarde N36 Vichte, Harelbeke, Roeselare, Diksmuide Waarmaarde (714 inh.) Avelgem (10.291 inh.) N353 Outrijve, Celles, Spiere-Helkijn, Pecq	Oudenaarde	Kortrijk
(European Union) (Belgium) Flanders West Flanders	Zwevegem	Avelgem - Kortrijk	Heestert (2.838 inh.) Moen (2.795 inh.) N391 Kortrijk, Deerlijk Bossuit–Kortrijk Canal Knokke Zwevegem (25.140 inh.)	Oudenaarde	Kortrijk
(European Union) (Belgium) Flanders West Flanders	Kortrijk	Kortrijk	N391 Vichte, Deerlijk 3 (Kortrijk-Oost) E17 Kortrijk, Ghent, Antwerp, Mouscron, Bruges (E403), Tournai (E403), France (Lille, Paris) 3ab (Kortrijk-Oost) R8, Kortrijk Ring Road Kortrijk, Harelbeke, Kuurne, Ingelmunster, Menen, Mouscron, Ypres Kortrijk (77.741 inh.) R36, Inner Kortrijk Ring Road Kortrijk, Harelbeke, Kuurne, Ingelmunster, Menen, Wevelgem, Mouscron, Zwevegem	Oudenaarde	Menen Ypres
(European Union) (Belgium) Flanders West Flanders	Kortrijk	Kortrijk	Interruption by R36 (Inner Kortrijk Ring Road) with junctions to N43 (Harelbeke, Waregem, Ghent), N50 (Ingelmunster, Bruges), N43 (Mouscron, France (Lille)) and N50 (Tournai).	Oudenaarde	Menen Ypres
(European Union) (Belgium) Flanders West Flanders	Kortrijk	Kortrijk	R36, Inner Kortrijk Ring Road Kortrijk, Harelbeke, Kuurne, Ingelmunster, Menen, Wevelgem, Mouscron, Zwevegem Bissegem (5.366 inh.) 11 (Bissegem) R8, Kortrijk Ring Road Kortrijk, Ypres, Harelbeke; Kuurne, Ingelmunster, Mouscron, Zwevegem, Tournai	Oudenaarde	Menen Ypres
(European Union) (Belgium) Flanders West Flanders	Wevelgem	Kortrijk - Menen	5 (Wevelgem) E403 Bruges, Roeselare, Tournai, Ypres (A19), Ghent (E17), Mouscron (E17), France (Lille (E17), Paris) Wevelgem (31.565 inh.)	Kortrijk	Menen Ypres
(European Union) (Belgium) Flanders West Flanders	Menen	Menen	N32 Ledegem, Roeselare, Bruges, France (Halluin, Tourcoing, Lille) Menen (33.982 inh.) N362, Menen Ring Road Menen-North N32b Menen-North, Ledegem, Roeselare, Bruges, France (Halluin) N362, Menen Ring Road Menen-North	Kortrijk	Ypres
(European Union) (Belgium) Flanders West Flanders	Wervik	Menen - Ypres	N58 Wervik, Comines-Warneton, Ypres (A19), Kortrijk (A19), France (Comines, Armentières) Geluwe (6.865 inh.) N311 Wervik, Comines-Warneton, France (Wervicq-Sud)	Menen Kortrijk	Ypres
(European Union) (Belgium) Flanders West Flanders	Zonnebeke	Menen - Ypres	N303 Wervik, Zonnebeke, Beselare Geluveld (1.652 inh.)	Menen Kortrijk	Ypres
(European Union) (Belgium) Flanders West Flanders	Ypres	Ypres	N37 Ieper-Zuid, Zonnebeke, Roeselare N345 Sint-Jan Hospital Ypres (35.039) N332 Zonnebeke N308, N37b Poperinge, Heuvelland, Mesen, Comines-Warneton, France (Armentières) N379, N369 Langemark-Poelkapelle, Roeselare, Boezinge, Diksmuide N38 Poperinge, Roeselare, Kortrijk, France (Dunkirk, Steenvoorde) Brielen (827 inh.) Elverdinge (1.766 inh.) N333 Poperinge	Menen Kortrijk	Koksijde
(European Union) (Belgium) Flanders West Flanders	Vleteren	Ypres - Koksijde	Woesten (1.262 inh.)	Ypres Kortrijk	Koksijde
(European Union) (Belgium) Flanders West Flanders	Vleteren / Lo-Reninge	Ypres - Koksijde	The N8 forms the border between Vleteren and Lo-Reninge.	Ypres Kortrijk	Koksijde
(European Union) (Belgium) Flanders West Flanders	Vleteren	Ypres - Koksijde	Oostvleteren (1.239 inh.) N321 Westvleteren, Krombeke, Roesbrugge-Haringe, Poperinge	Ypres Kortrijk	Koksijde
(European Union) (Belgium) Flanders West Flanders	Alveringem / Lo-Reninge	Ypres - Koksijde	The N8 forms the border between Alveringem and Lo-Reninge. N364 Lo-Reninge, Abele, Beveren, Roesbrugge-Haringe, Diksmuide	Ypres Kortrijk	Koksijde
(European Union) (Belgium) Flanders West Flanders	Alveringem	Ypres - Koksijde	Hoogstade (385 inh.) N319 Alveringem, Diksmuide	Ypres Kortrijk	Koksijde
(European Union) (Belgium) Flanders West Flanders	Veurne	Ypres - Koksijde	1a (Veurne) E40 Ostend, Bruges, Brussels, France (Dunkirk, Calais) N390 Diksmuide Veurne (12.295 inh.) N39 Veurne, Adinkerke, Nieuwpoort, France (Dunkirk) N35 Veurne, De Panne, Diksmuide, Roeselare	Ypres Kortrijk	Koksijde
(European Union) (Belgium) Flanders West Flanders	Koksijde	Ypres - Koksijde	N396 De Panne, Oostduinkerke, Nieuwpoort Koksijde (21.851 inh.) N34 De Panne, Nieuwpoort, Ostend	Ypres Kortrijk	Koksijde

== See also ==
- Transport in Belgium
