= Kortrijk-Wevelgem International Airport =

Belgian airport

Kortrijk-Wevelgem International Airport Advanced Landing Ground (ALG) B-55
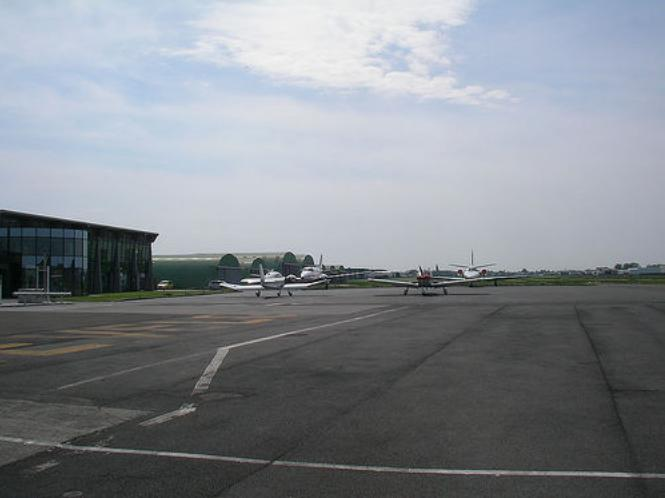
- IATA: KJK; ICAO: EBKT

Summary
- Airport type: Public
- Operator: Internationale Luchthaven Kortrijk-Wevelgem
- Serves: Kortrijk and Wevelgem, Belgium
- Location: Wevelgem, West Flanders, Flemish Region
- Elevation AMSL: 55 ft / 17 m
- Coordinates: 50°49′07″N 003°12′23″E
- Website: www.KortrijkAirport.be

Map
- Location in Belgium

Runways
Direction	Length		Surface
Direction	m	ft	Surface
06/24	1,900	6,234	Asphalt
- Sources: Belgian AIP

Kortrijk-Wevelgem International Airport (IATA: KJK, ICAO: EBKT) is an airport located in the town of Wevelgem, West Flanders in the Flemish Region of Belgium and partly also in the Bissegem section of the city of Kortrijk which is 4 km (2 miles) to the east.

== History ==
The airport was created in 1916 by the Germans during the First World War.

In 2022 the airport attracted media attention after Zara Rutherford became the youngest woman to fly across the Earth solo. She both started and finished the program on the airport's grounds.

== Features ==
There is a passenger terminal with police and customs on demand.

The airport runway is 1,900 m × 45 m (6,234 ft × 148 ft). Alongside a section of the airport is a business park, some of which is restricted to enterprises undertaking airport-related activities: several of the business park tenants have paid for direct private access to the runway. The aerodrome used to offer IFR ("instrument" or "blind flying") procedures using ILS, NDB and DME radio beacons, but as of June 2017, these had been withdrawn from the AIP. In 2019 IFR operations were reestablished, now using GNSS-based RNAV procedures.

== Uses ==
It is used mainly as a business airport. One of the main users of this airport is Abelag Aviation, though it is also used by flying clubs and schools. According to its official website, around 100,000 passengers use the airport every year.

== Airlines and destinations ==
There are no scheduled services offered from Kortrijk-Wevelgem Airport.

== Ground transportation ==
=== By car ===
The airport is situated on national road 8 (Brussels - Koksijde), nearby ringway 8 (Kortrijk), E17/A14 and the E403/A17 (Zeebrugge - Bruges - Tournai).

=== By bus ===
Bus 40 operated by De Lijn connects the airport with Kortrijk and its railway station (local, national, international trains) and Menen and its railway station (national trains).
