= Jean Thienpont =

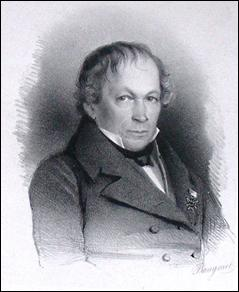
Portrait by Charles Baugniet (1835)

Jean Ignace Thienpont (1774–1863) was a member of the National Congress of Belgium and of the Chamber of Representatives for the constituency of Oudenaarde.

== Life ==
Thienpont was born in the village of Etikhove, in the County of Flanders, on 7 October 1774. His parents were Josse Thienpont and Anne-Thérèse de Looze. He was educated at the college in Oudenaarde. In 1790, at the age of 16, he joined the army of the United Belgian States, seeing action against Austrian forces in the defence of Brussels. After the end of the war he returned to school, and then enrolled at Trinity College in Leuven University. He graduated Bachelor of Laws on 8 February 1796, and Licentiate of Laws on 6 May 1797, shortly before the university was closed down.

A convinced Catholic, he was barred from public office until the Concordat of 1801, after which he was called to the bar. In 1806 he became mayor of Maarke-Kerkem in the Département Escaut and in 1807 a justice of the peace in the canton of Oudenaarde. On 5 June 1811 he was promoted to judge in the Tribunal d'instance for the Arrondissement of Oudenaarde. He resigned his public positions on 7 October 1817, having conscientious objections to swearing loyalty to the United Kingdom of the Netherlands. In 1820 he was elected to the city council of Oudenaarde and to the Provincial States of East Flanders, but the same year he resigned as alderman and was reappointed to the bench. In 1830 he supported the Belgian Revolution and on 8 October 1830 the Provisional Government of Belgium appointed him president of the Tribunal of first instance in Oudenaarde. On 3 November 1830 he was elected to the National Congress that agreed the Constitution of Belgium.

He successfully stood for election to the Chamber of Representatives in the 1831 general election, and was re-elected in 1833, 1835, 1839, 1843 and 1847, after which he no longer stood for re-election as an 1848 law made it impossible to combine the positions of judge and legislator. He remained president of the court in Oudenaarde until his retirement on 14 June 1858. He died in Oudenaarde on 26 September 1863.
