= Verroken =

Verroken is a surname. Notable people with the surname include:

- André Verroken (1939–2020), Flemish furniture designer
- Jan Verroken (1917–2020), Belgian politician
