= Kluisbergen =

Municipality in the Belgian province of East Flanders

- Municipality
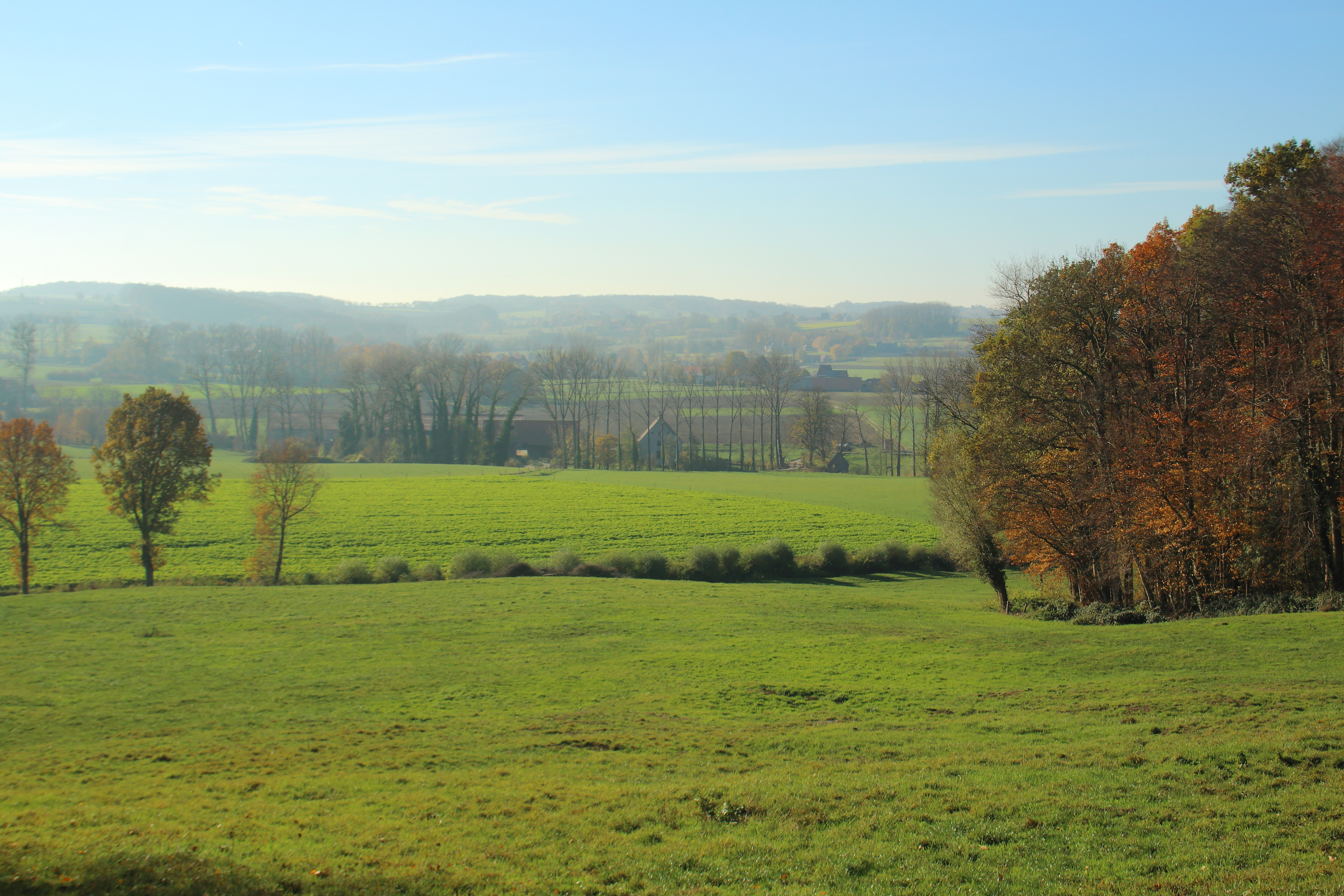
- Typical Flemish Ardennes landscape

- Flag Coat of arms

- Location of Kluisbergen in East Flanders
- Interactive map of Kluisbergen
- Location in Belgium
- Coordinates: 50°47′N 03°31′E
- Country: Belgium
- Community: Flemish Community
- Region: Flemish Region
- Province: East Flanders
- Arrondissement: Oudenaarde

Government
  - Mayor: Philippe Willequet
  - Governing party: Gemeentebelangen

Area
  - Total: 30.63 km^{2} (11.83 sq mi)

Population (2018-01-01)
  - Total: 6,453
  - Density: 210.7/km^{2} (545.6/sq mi)
- Postal codes: 9690
- NIS code: 45060
- Area codes: 055
- Website: www.kluisbergen.be

Kluisbergen (Dutch pronunciation: [ˈklœyzˌbɛrɣə(n)]) is a municipality located in the Belgian province of East Flanders, along the Scheldt river. The municipality comprises the towns of Berchem, Kwaremont, Ruien and Zulzeke which fused in 1971. In 2021, Kluisbergen had a total population of 6,682. The total area is 30.38 km². The town of Ruien is the largest and has some outdoor facilities. Kluisbergen is also home to the "Kluisbos", a forest which has two ancient standing stones, which date back to Roman times.

== Geography ==
Kluisbergen consists of four towns:

I	Berchem
II	Ruien
III	Kwaremont
IV	Zulzeke

Neighbouring towns/municipalities:

a	Ronse
b	Nukerke (Maarkedal)
c	Melden (Oudenaarde)
d	Elsegem (Wortegem-Petegem)
e	Kerkhove (Avelgem)
f	Waarmaarde (Avelgem)
g	Avelgem (Avelgem)
h	Orroir (Mont-de-l'Enclus)
i	Amengies (Mont-de-l'Enclus)
j	Russeignies (Mont-de-l'Enclus)

=== Map ===
Map of Kluisbergen with its neighbouring towns/municipalities. The yellow markings resemble the most populated areas.

=== Landscape ===
The Scheldt makes up the northwestern border of Kluisbergen where the landscape is rather flat. Traveling south or southeast is met with an increasing moderately hilly landscape all the way to the southern border

There are three main hills in Kluisbergen. The Kluisberg is mainly located on the border of Ruien and Orroir, stretching all the way to Kwaremont. The Paterberg is located in the middle of Kwaremont. The Hotondberg is located on the border of Zulzeke and Ronse and is the highest point of East Flanders. The three hills are the westernmost hills of the Flemish Ardennes.

== Tourism ==
Flemish Ardennes are known for their steep hills with several of them having forests on their hillsides. Kluisbergen is no exception and is best known for these hills. Their important role in the Tour of Flanders make them popular among cyclists. The municipality incorporates its many field trails in hiking routes with hiking tours are also being organized.

Kwaremont has the title of "Artist Village" because of its numerous painters and art galleries.
