= Oudenaarde (Chamber of Representatives constituency) =

Belgian political subdivision

Oudenaarde was a constituency used to elect members of the Belgian Chamber of Representatives between 1831 and 1995. Its main urban centre was the municipality of Oudenaarde.

== Representatives ==
Election	Representative (Party)	Representative (Party)	Representative (Party)
1831	Charles Liedts (Liberal)	Hippolyte della Faille d'Huysse (Catholic)	Jean Thienpont (Catholic)
1833	Charles Liedts (Liberal)	Edouard De Jaegher (Catholic)	Jean Thienpont (Catholic)
1837	Charles Liedts (Liberal)	Jean-Marie de Villegas (Liberal)	Jean Thienpont (Catholic)
1841	Charles Liedts (Liberal)	Jean-Marie de Villegas (Liberal)	Jean Thienpont (Catholic)
1845	Charles Liedts (Liberal)	Jean-Marie de Villegas (Liberal)	Jean Thienpont (Catholic)
1848	Frédéricq De Bourdeau d'Huy (Liberal)	Raymond Dhont (Liberal)	Victor Liefmans (Liberal)
1852	Léon Victor Jean Thienpont (Catholic)	Théodore Van der Donckt (Catholic)	Yves Magherman (Catholic)
1856	Léon Victor Jean Thienpont (Catholic)	Théodore Van der Donckt (Catholic)	Yves Magherman (Catholic)
1857	Léon Victor Jean Thienpont (Catholic)	Théodore Van der Donckt (Catholic)	Yves Magherman (Catholic)
1861	Léon Victor Jean Thienpont (Catholic)	Théodore Van der Donckt (Catholic)	Yves Magherman (Catholic)
1864	Léon Victor Jean Thienpont (Catholic)	Théodore Van der Donckt (Catholic)	Yves Magherman (Catholic)
1868	Léon Victor Jean Thienpont (Catholic)	Théodore Van der Donckt (Catholic)	Yves Magherman (Catholic)
1870	Léon Victor Jean Thienpont (Catholic)	Théodore Van der Donckt (Catholic)	Yves Magherman (Catholic)
1874	Léon Victor Jean Thienpont (Catholic)	Théodore Van der Donckt (Catholic)	Yves Magherman (Catholic)
1878	Edmond Van Brabandt (Catholic)	Florent De Bleeckere (Catholic)	Yves Magherman (Catholic)
1882	Edmond Van Brabandt (Catholic)	Florent De Bleeckere (Catholic)	Yves Magherman (Catholic)
1886	Ephrem De Malander (Catholic)	Louis Thienpont (Catholic)	Paul Raepsaet (Catholic)
1890	Ephrem De Malander (Catholic)	Louis Thienpont (Catholic)	Paul Raepsaet (Catholic)
1892	Ephrem De Malander (Catholic)	Louis Thienpont (Catholic)	Paul Raepsaet (Catholic)
1894	Ephrem De Malander (Catholic)	Louis Thienpont (Catholic)	Paul Raepsaet (Catholic)
1898	Auguste Ferrant (Catholic)	Louis Thienpont (Catholic)	Paul Raepsaet (Catholic)
1900	Jean-Baptiste de Ghellinck d'Elseghem (Catholic)	Louis Thienpont (Catholic)	Camille Liefmans (Liberal)
1904	Jean-Baptiste de Ghellinck d'Elseghem (Catholic)	Louis Thienpont (Catholic)	Pierre D'hauwer (Liberal)
1908	Jean-Baptiste de Ghellinck d'Elseghem (Catholic)	Louis Thienpont (Catholic)	Pierre D'hauwer (Liberal)
1912	Gaston Behaghel de Bueren (Catholic)	Louis Thienpont (Catholic)	Alfred Amelot (Liberal)
1919	Eugène Soudan (PS)	Robert Doutreligne (Catholic)	Alfred Amelot (Liberal)
1921	Eugène Soudan (PS)	Adrien Iweins d'Eeckhoutte (Catholic)	Alfred Amelot (Liberal)
1925	Eugène Soudan (PS)	Leo Vindevogel (Catholic)	Alfred Amelot (Liberal)
1929	Eugène Soudan (PS)	Leo Vindevogel (Catholic)	Alfred Amelot (Liberal)
1932	Eugène Soudan (PS)	Leo Vindevogel (Catholic)	Alfred Amelot (Liberal)
1936	Philippe Behaghel de Bueren (REX)	Leo Vindevogel (Catholic)	Alfred Amelot (Liberal)
1939	Eugène Soudan (PS)	Leo Vindevogel (Catholic)	Alfred Amelot (Liberal)
1946	Eugène Soudan (PS)	Maurice Herman (CVP)	Alfred Amelot (Liberal)
1949	Eugène Soudan (PS)	Maurice Herman (CVP)	Alfred Amelot (Liberal)
1950	Eugène Soudan (PS)	Maurice Herman (CVP)	Jan Verroken (CVP)
1954	Eugène Soudan (PS)	Michel Van Caeneghem (CVP)	Jan Verroken (CVP)
1958	Liban Martens (Liberal)	Michel Van Caeneghem (CVP)	Jan Verroken (CVP)
1961	Liban Martens (Liberal)	Marcel Vanderhaegen (BSP)	Jan Verroken (CVP)
1965	Liban Martens (Liberal)	Marcel Vanderhaegen (BSP)	Jan Verroken (CVP)
1968	Denis Baeskens (CVP)	Herman De Croo (PVV)	Jan Verroken (CVP)
1971	Marcel Vanderhaegen (BSP)	Herman De Croo (PVV)	Jan Verroken (CVP)
1974	Paul Ghysbrecht (BSP)	Herman De Croo (PVV)	Jan Verroken (CVP)
1977	Lieven Bauwens (VU)	Herman De Croo (PVV)	Jan Verroken (CVP)
1978	Albert De Cordier (PVV)	Herman De Croo (PVV)	Jan Verroken (CVP)
1981	Elie Bockstal (CVP)	Herman De Croo (PVV)	Paul Tant (CVP)
1985	2 seats	Herman De Croo (PVV)	Paul Tant (CVP)
1988	2 seats	Herman De Croo (PVV)	Jozef Cuyvers (Agalev)
1991	2 seats	Karim Van Overmeire (VB)	Paul Tant (CVP)
1995	Merged into Oudenaarde-Aalst		
