= Joris Nachtergaele =

Belgian politician

Joris Nachtergaele (born 21 August 1977 in Oudenaarde) is a Belgian politician for the N-VA.

Nachtergaele was an original founder of the N-VA in 2001. He was a member of the municipal council of Maarkedal from 2007 and since 2015 he has been mayor of Maarkedal. In 2019, he became a member of the Flemish Parliament.
