= Aalst-Oudenaarde (Chamber of Representatives constituency) =

Belgian political subdivision

Aalst-Oudenaarde was a constituency used to elect members of the Belgian Chamber of Representatives between 1995 and 2003.

== Representatives ==
Election	Representative (Party)	Representative (Party)	Representative (Party)	Representative (Party)	Representative (Party)	Representative (Party)
1995	Formed from a merger of Aalst and Oudenaarde					
1995	Dirk Van der Maelen (PS)	Herman De Croo (VLD)	Paul Tant (CVP)	Jan Eeman (VLD)	Julien Verstraeten (PS)	Luc Willems (CVP)
1999	Dirk Van der Maelen (PS)	Herman De Croo (VLD)	Paul Tant (CVP)	Jan Eeman (VLD)	Guy D'haeseleer (VB)	Guy Hove (VLD)
