= Melden =

- Village
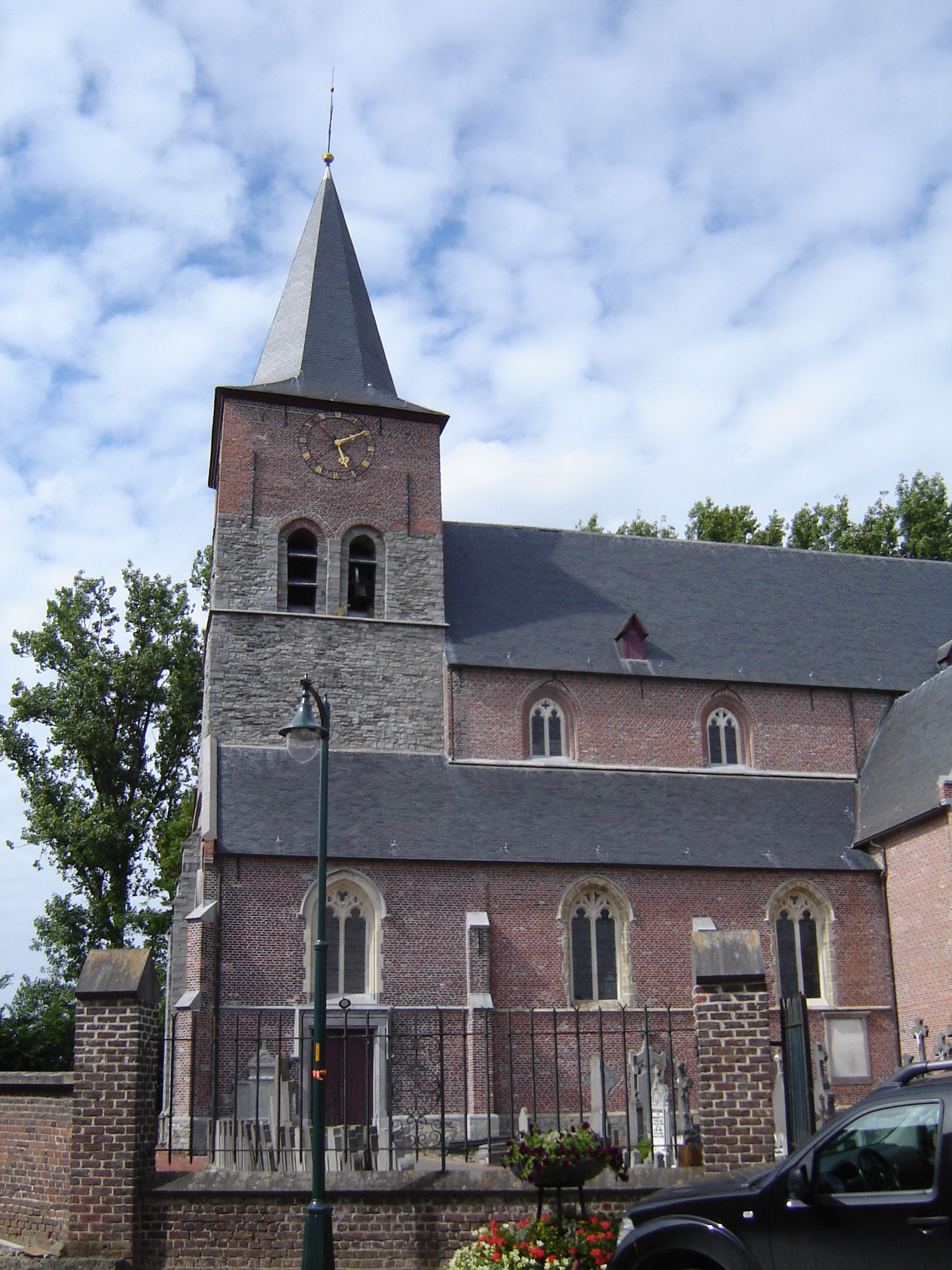
- Church of Melden (2009)

- Location in Belgium
- Coordinates: 50°49′N 3°34′E
- Country: Belgium
- Region: Flemish Region
- Province: East Flanders
- Municipality: Oudenaarde; Kluisbergen

Area
  - Total: 9.53 km^{2} (3.68 sq mi)

Population (2021)
  - Total: 938
  - Density: 98.4/km^{2} (255/sq mi)
- Time zone: CET

Melden (Dutch pronunciation: [ˈmɛldə(n)]) is a village belonging partly to the municipality of Oudenaarde and partly to the municipality of Kluisbergen. It is located in the Flemish Ardennes, the hilly southern part of the province of East Flanders, Belgium.

== History ==
The village is located on an elevation near the Scheldt River. During canalisation efforts, remains on a Roman site were discovered. The village was conquered by the Count of Flanders in 1030. The economy was mainly based on animal husbandry and wool production. In 1960, the N8 was widened which resulted in the demolition of many house along the road. Melden was an independent municipality until 1971 when it was merged into Oudenaarde.

== Koppenberg ==
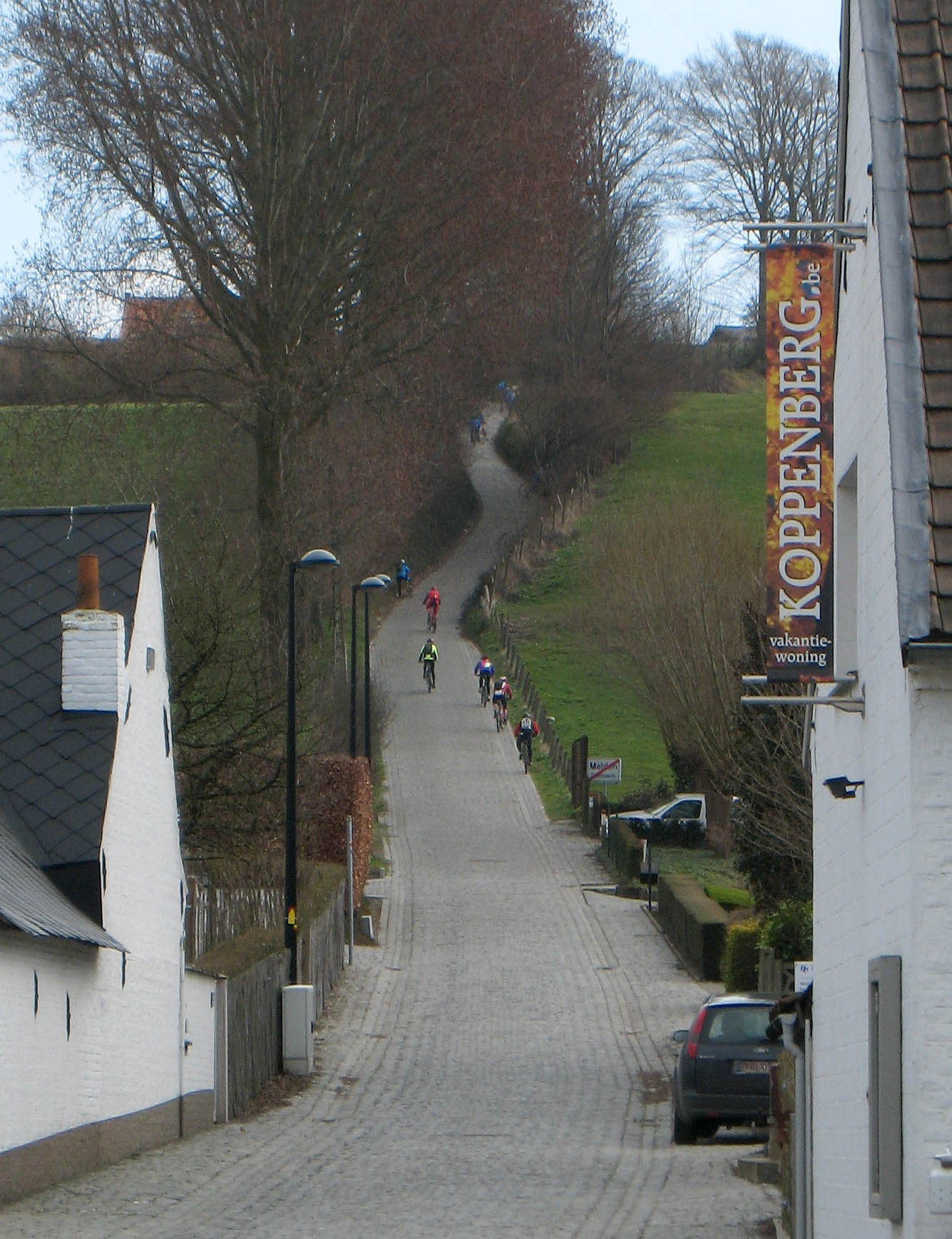
Koppenberg Hill (2009)

The Koppenberg is a hill near Melden which is known for cycling races in general and the Tour of Flanders in particular. The road to the top of the hill is a steep, narrow cobblestone street which is serious challenge often forcing professionals to dismount.

== Notable people ==
- Jan Verroken (1917–2020), politician.
