= André Verroken =

Belgian furniture designer (1939–2020)

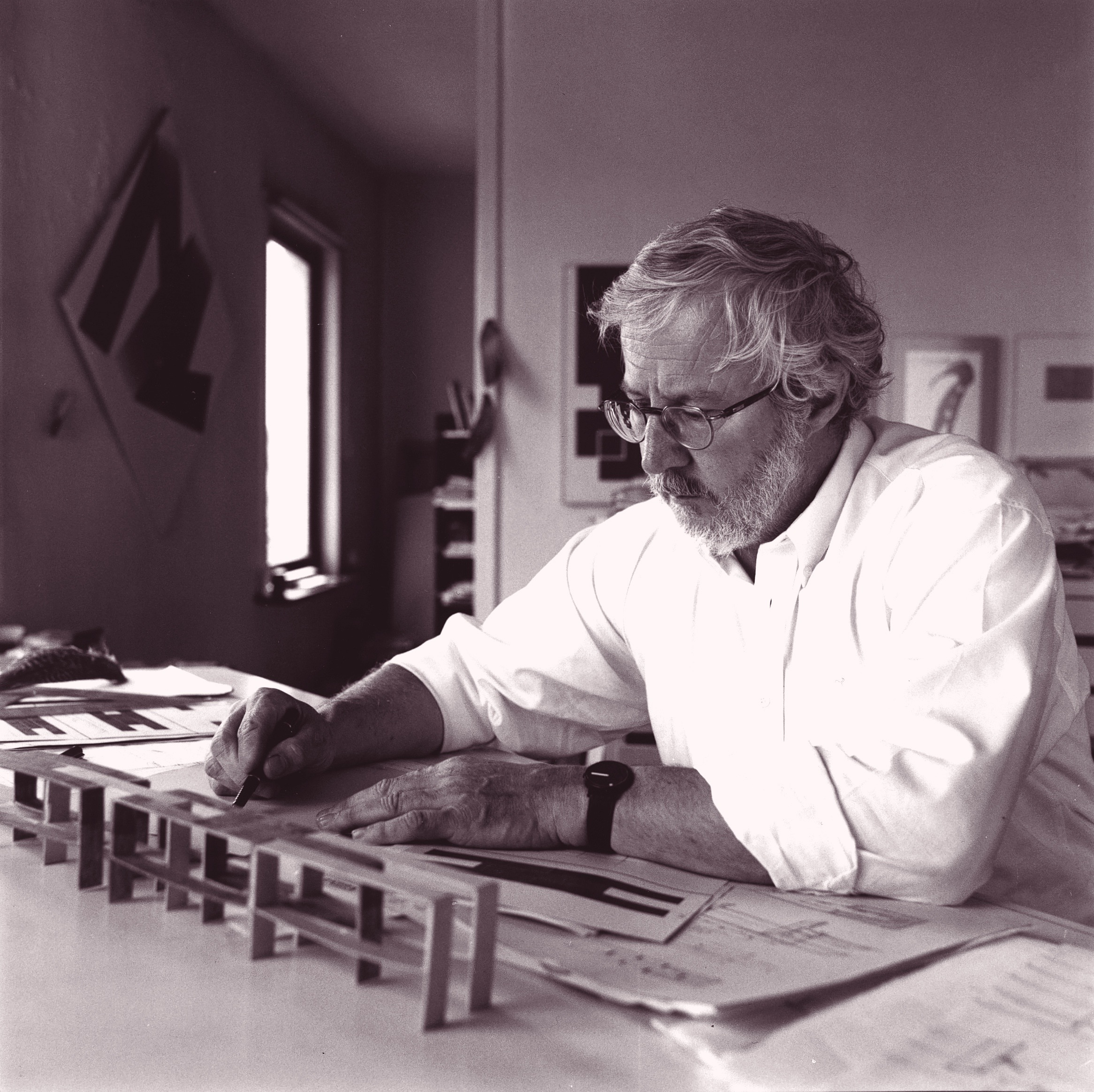
- André Verroken working at his desk in his office in Ghent, Belgium, in 2005.
- Born: May 21, 1939; Oudenaarde, Belgium
- Died: April 5, 2020 (aged 80); Ronse, Belgium
- Education: Sint-Lucas School of Architecture
- Known for: furniture design, interior design
- Partner: Arlette Gesquière
- Website: andreverroken.octopuls.com

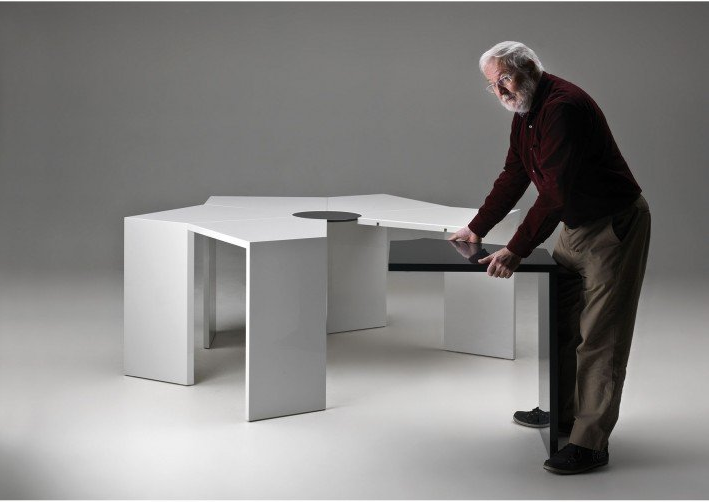
André Verroken demonstrates setup of his table 'Carrousel'

André Verroken (Oudenaarde 21 May 1939 – Ronse 5 April 2020) was a Flemish and Belgian furniture designer and interior architect.

== Life ==
Verroken grew up in the Flemish Ardennes in Flanders (Belgium) where he, like his father, was trained as a furniture maker. After marrying Françoise Willecomme and moving to Brussels where he follows an education at Sint-Lucas School of Architecture and becomes an interior architect and furniture designer. In Brussels, he became the father of 3 children : Hendrik (1964), Jan (1965) and Inge (1970). In 1967-1968 he taught Interior Architecture at the Imelda Institute in Brussels. In 1968, he expanded his career as an interior architect from his home and office in Schaerbeek. The next year in 1969, he designed seating furniture for Spectrum in the Netherlands and meets the Dutch designer Martin Visser whom he will call his first great teacher. In the same year he also befriended the constructivist painter Marcel-Henri Verdren.

In 1983, he moves to Ghent, with his new partner and manager of a fabric store Arlette Gesquiere, and starts making visual work as a derivative of his furniture designs. In 1983/1984 he became one of the founders and managing director of the Association of Flemish Designers (VVVO). In 1985, he befriends the Basque sculptor Eduardo Chillida to whom he will dedicate a table and furniture design, which in turn will result (in 2007) in a partly posthumous double exhibition Chillida-Verroken. Eventually he moves to Maarkedal where he converts a small warehouse into a design studio and further focuses on designing furniture and visual work. In 2002, he received the Henry van de Velde Prize for Career from the then Flemish Institute for Independent Entrepreneurship (VIZO). In 2016, the municipal council of Maarkedal created a "Special Prize André Verroken" in the context of Z +, a competition for designers, awarded once in 2017.

== Comments on his work ==
"Looking for the meaning of life. That is, in a nutshell, what furniture designer André Verroken does with his creations." (Caroline Goosens in Belgian newspaper De Standaard)

"André Verroken is a Flemish furniture artist, for whom the social and aesthetic aspect of a piece of furniture has just as much value as its usefulness. Verroken has gradually developed its own style and enriched the world with furniture that also has a cultural load, which are sober and radiate warmth, which are at the same time a piece of furniture and a work of art, and which carry a poetry that you rarely find in other furniture." (Lies Kerkhofs, former director of Landcommanderij Alden Biesen, 2007)

== Awards and prizes ==
- An Iron A 'Design Award in 2016 for the table "Homage to Eduardo Chillida" and for "Janus", awarded at the international design competition A "Design Award, Italy.
- In 2014 silver award for dining table "Carroussel" and a bronze award for the side table "Fallen bird" awarded at the international design competition A'Design Award, Italy.
- Received the Henry van de Velde Prize for career in 2002 by the Flemish Institute for Independent Entrepreneurship (VIZO).
- Nominated in 1998 for the "1st European Prize for Contemporary Art- and Design-Led Crafts 1998" organised by the WCC (World Crafts Council Europe).
- Winner of the 3rd International Furniture Design Competition Asahikawa, Japan in 1996.
- Awarded the most creative and innovative furniture designer in Flanders in 1995 for the period 1980 - 1995, Ministry of Flemish Culture, Flemish Institute for Independent Entrepreneurship (VIZO) - Art Craft Service.
- In 1994 winner of the VIZO Prize “Henry van de Velde 1994” for Best Product with the table “Homenaje a Eduardo Chillida”.
- In 1986 Honorable Mention in the “LIGHT” competition organised by Fa.Light in Brussels.
- In 1984 laureate of the international competition “Art Craft in Industrial Application” organised by the Benelux Economic Union, Special Committee for Self-employed, Design Center Brussels.
- Selected in 1982 for the competition exhibition “Belgian Furniture Sculpture 1982” at the 45th “International Furniture Fair” in Brussels.
- Received in 1978 the “Belgian Label for Industrial Design” for the storage furniture Capri, designed on behalf of N-Line International in Kluisbergen (Design Center Brussels).

== Books ==
- "Confessiones: Eduardo Chillada i André Verroken" by Lies Kerkhofs, Lut, Maris and Bram Hammacher, published at De Mijlpaal Art Gallery in 2007.
- André Verroken - The transcendence of utility ”by Christine Deboosere, Bert Hoogewijs and André Verroken, published by the Department of the Royal Academy of Fine Arts - Hogeschool Gent - VZW Droom en Daad in 2006.
- "André Verroken" by Erwin Mortier and Geert Bekaert, published by Ludion in 2005.
- André Verroken - Meubelen "by Sarah De Keuster, published by Stichting Kunstboek in 2000.
- “The Uneasiness of André Verroken" by Geert Bekaert, published by Carto in 1998.

== Exhibitions (selection) ==
- 1979: Participation in the exhibition “Möbel aus Belgiën ab Henry van de Velde bis heute” in the Museum Volk und Wirtschaft in Düsseldorf, Germany.
- 1980: Participation in the exhibition “Furniture from Belgium from Henry van de Velde to Today” in the Design Center in Brussels, Belgium.
- 1981: Participation in the exhibition "C + M" 81 "during the 44th" International Furniture Trade Fair "in Brussels, Belgium.
- 1982: Selected for the competition exhibition “Belgian Furniture Sculpture 1982” at the 45th “International Furniture Trade Fair” in Brussels, Belgium.
- 1983: Participation in the exhibition “Flemish Furniture Designers introduce themselves” in the Flemish Cultural Center “De Brakke Grond” in Amsterdam, the Netherlands.
- 1987: Participation in the exhibition "3. Internationaler Farb-Design-Preis 1986-87 ”in the Design Center in Stuttgart, Germany. Participation in the exhibition “Made in Belgium” in Brussels, Belgium.
- 1988: Solo exhibition in Gallery XXI in Antwerp, Belgium.
- 1991: Participation in the group exhibition “Artists from Belgium” in Galerie Vromans / De Sluis in Amsterdam, the Netherlands.
- 1992: Participation in the 18th Triennial di Milano, stand of the Flemish Community (VIZO), Italy. Solo exhibition in the Flemish Cultural Center “De Brakke Grond” in Amsterdam, the Netherlands.
- 1994: Participation in the 14th Biennal of Industrial Design in Ljubljana, Slovenia.
- 1996: Participation exhibition “Vlaamse Sier” in the Flemish Cultural Center “De Brakke Grond” in Amsterdam (Netherlands). Solo exhibition at Galerie Langenberg in Amsterdam (Netherlands). Participation in the exhibition “Design with Love, Life with Wood” in the Taisetsu Arena Hall in, Japan. Participation in the exhibition “Design with Love, Life with Wood” in the “Living Design Center OZONE”, Tokyo, Japan.
- 1997: Participation exhibition “Abitare il Tempo” in Verona, Italy. Participation in the exhibition “Bullet-Proof Forms: joies i mobles de Flandes” in the Palau Marc in Barcelona, Spain. Participation in the exhibition “Contemporary Design from Belgium” during the “Brussels International Furniture Fair, Brussels, Belgium.
- 1998: Participation in the exhibition organized as part of the "1st European Prize for Contemporary Art-and Design-Led Crafts 1998" in Palais Harrach in Vienna, Austria.
- 1999: Participation in exhibition organized by the WCC in the Röhsska Museum, Vasagatan, Gothenburg, Sweden. Participation in exhibition at the Musée des Arts Décoratifs, Paris, France. Participation in the exhibition "Gallery of the Vizo" (Flemish Institute for Independent Entrepreneurship), Brussels, Belgium.
- 2000: Retrospective exhibition in the VIZO gallery in Brussels, Belgium, on the occasion of the publication of the book "André Verroken, Meubels", published by Stichting Kunstboek. Participation in the exhibition "In and Out" in the gallery of VIZO in Brussels, Belgium.
- 2002: Participation Biennale International Design Saint-Etienne, France. Exhibition in the gallery of the VIZO in Brussels, Belgium, following the attribution of the Henry van de Velde Prize 2002.
- 2004: Participation Fourth Triennial for Design "(Im) perfect by Design" in the Art and History Museum in Brussels, Belgium.
- 2005-2006: Participation in the exhibition "Design De Flandre" in the Center de design de Montréal, Canada, organized by l'UQAM.
- 2007-2008: Participation in the 5th Design Triennal "Beauty Singular < Plural" exhibition in the Art and History Museum in Brussels, Belgium.

== Work in collection or possession ==
- Province of East Flanders, Belgium ("Katheder" pulpit)
- Katholieke Hogeschool VIVES, Bruges, Belgium (seating "Stool")
- Star restaurant Hof van Cleve owned by top chef Peter Goossens, Belgium (various pieces including the ‘Cathedral table')
- S.M.A.K., Museum of Contemporary Art, Ghent, Belgium (table 'HOMENAJE A EDUARDO CHILLIDA')
- Design Museum Ghent, Belgium (various furniture pieces)
