= Louise-Marie (hamlet) =

- Hamlet
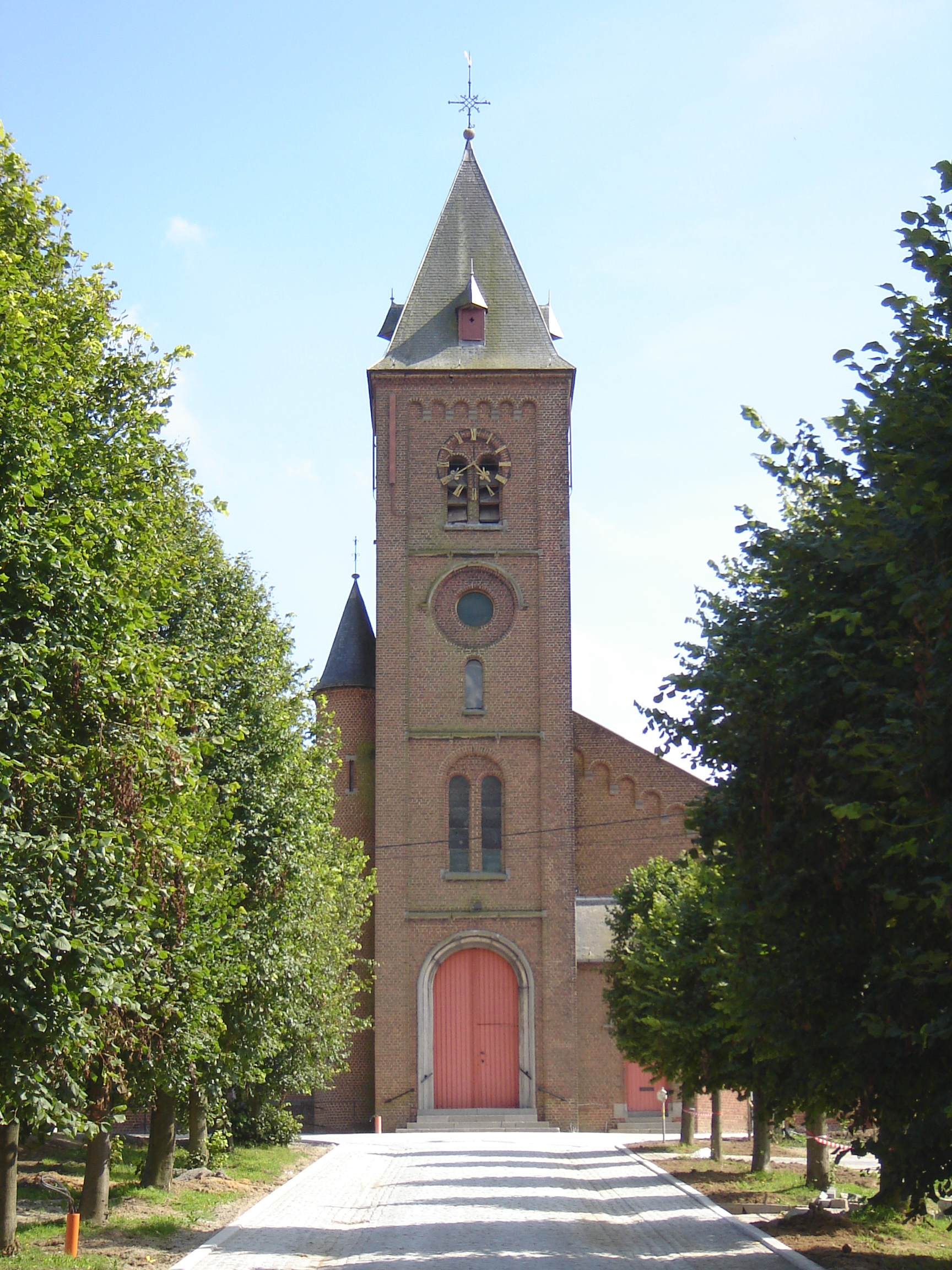
- Church of Louise-Marie (2007)

- Location in Belgium
- Coordinates: 50.77168°N 3.64443°E
- Country: Belgium
- Region: Flemish Region
- Province: East Flanders
- Municipality: Ronse; Maarkedal

Area
  - Total: 3.29 km^{2} (1.27 sq mi)

Population (2021)
  - Total: 445
  - Density: 135/km^{2} (350/sq mi)
- Time zone: CET

Louise-Marie is a hamlet partly belonging to the municipality of Ronse and partly to the municipality of Maarkedal. It is located in the Flemish Ardennes, the southern part of the province of East Flanders, Belgium.

The parish dates from the early 19th century. At first plans to create a proper village with a church were postponed. The plans were revived in 1845, but no longer as an independent municipality.

The hamlet Louise-Marie was officially established in 1850, and was named after the first queen of Belgium, Louise-Marie d'Orleans, who died in the same year.

== Saint Leonard Institute ==
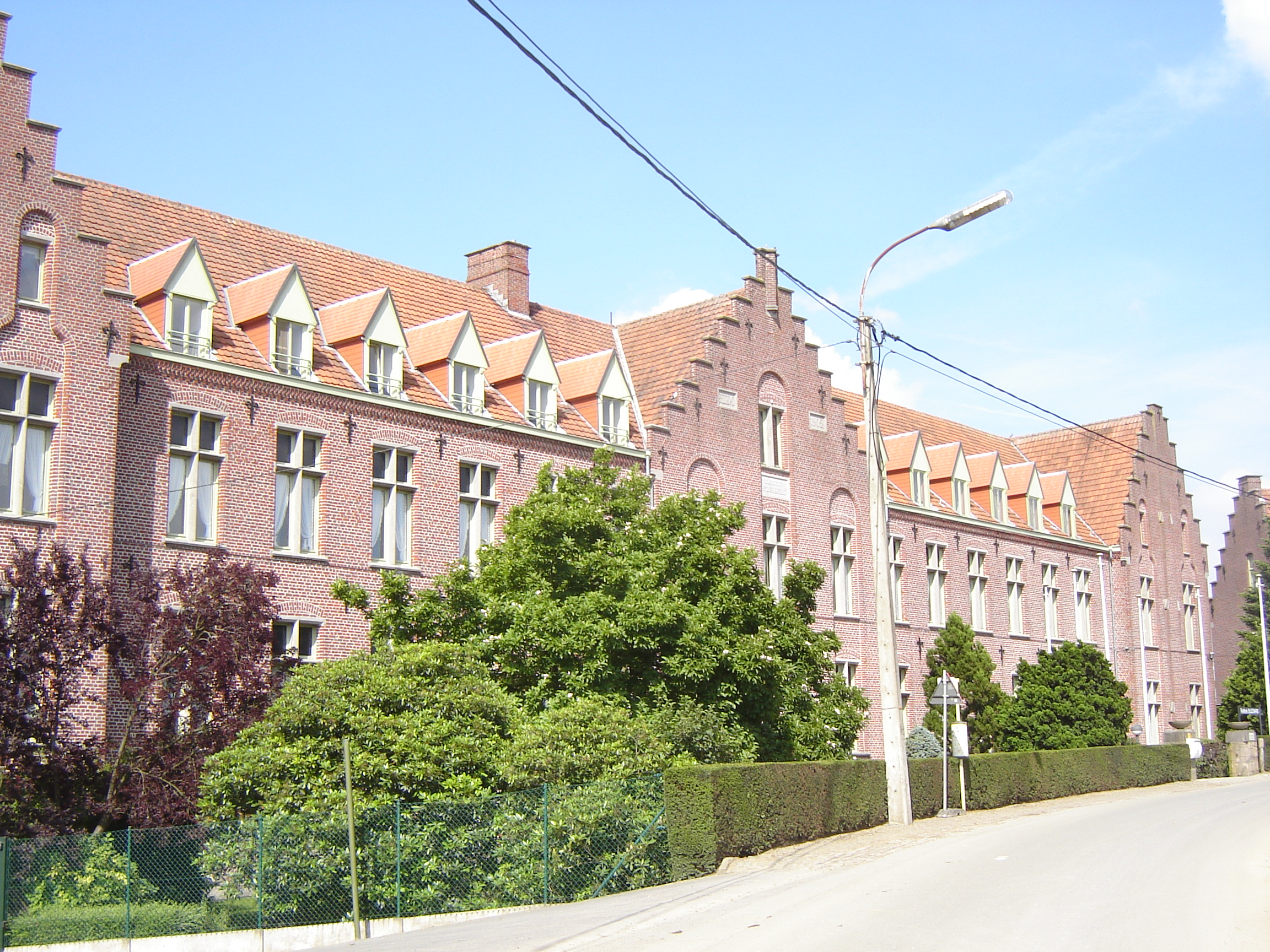
Saint Leonard Institute

A dominating feature of the hamlet is the Saint Leonard Institute. The institute was established in 1902 as a sanatorium by the Sisters of Mercy of Ronse. It is currently in use as a retirement home.
