= Bossuit–Kortrijk Canal =

Canal in Belgium

Kortrijk–Bossuit Canal
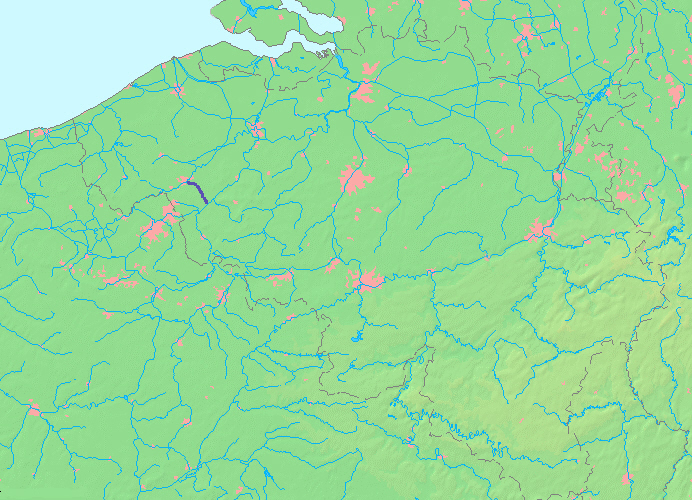
- Map of the canal route
- Interactive map of Kortrijk–Bossuit Canal

Specifications
- Length: 15.5 km (9.6 mi)
- Locks: 6
- Status: Open

Geography
- Start point: Kortrijk
- End point: Bossuit
- Beginning coordinates: 50.49°N 03.0°E (easternmost point)
- Ending coordinates: 50.44°N 3.24°E (westernmost point)
- Connects to: River Leie, River Scheldt

The Kortrijk–Bossuit Canal (Dutch: Kanaal Kortrijk-Bossuit, French: Canal Bossuit-Courtrai) is a canal in western Belgium, which connects the city of Kortrijk to village of Bossuit. It forms a direct link between the river Leie and the river Scheldt.

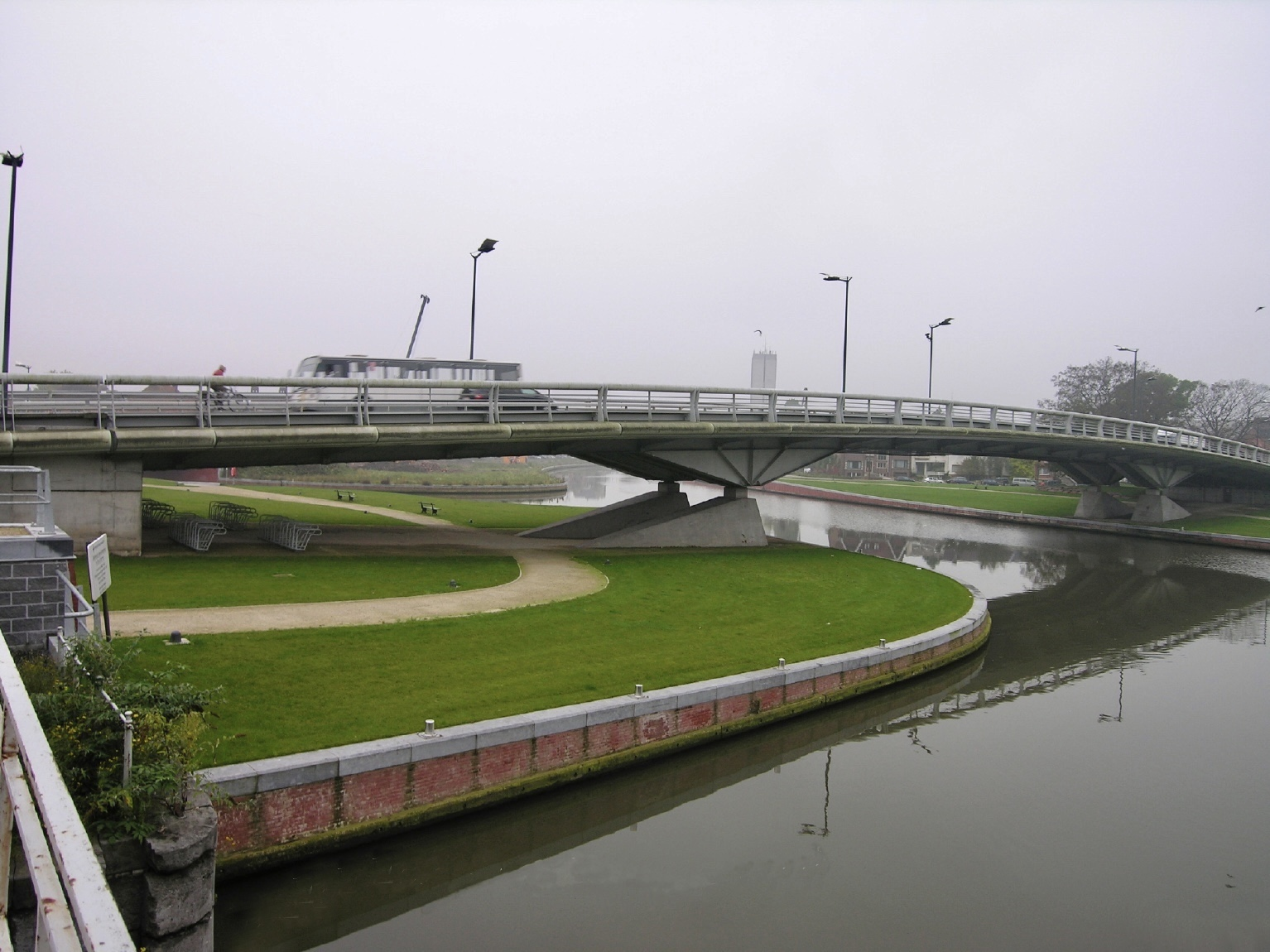
Kortrijk-Bossuit Canal ends in the River Leie in Kortrijk
