= Maarke-Kerkem =

- Village
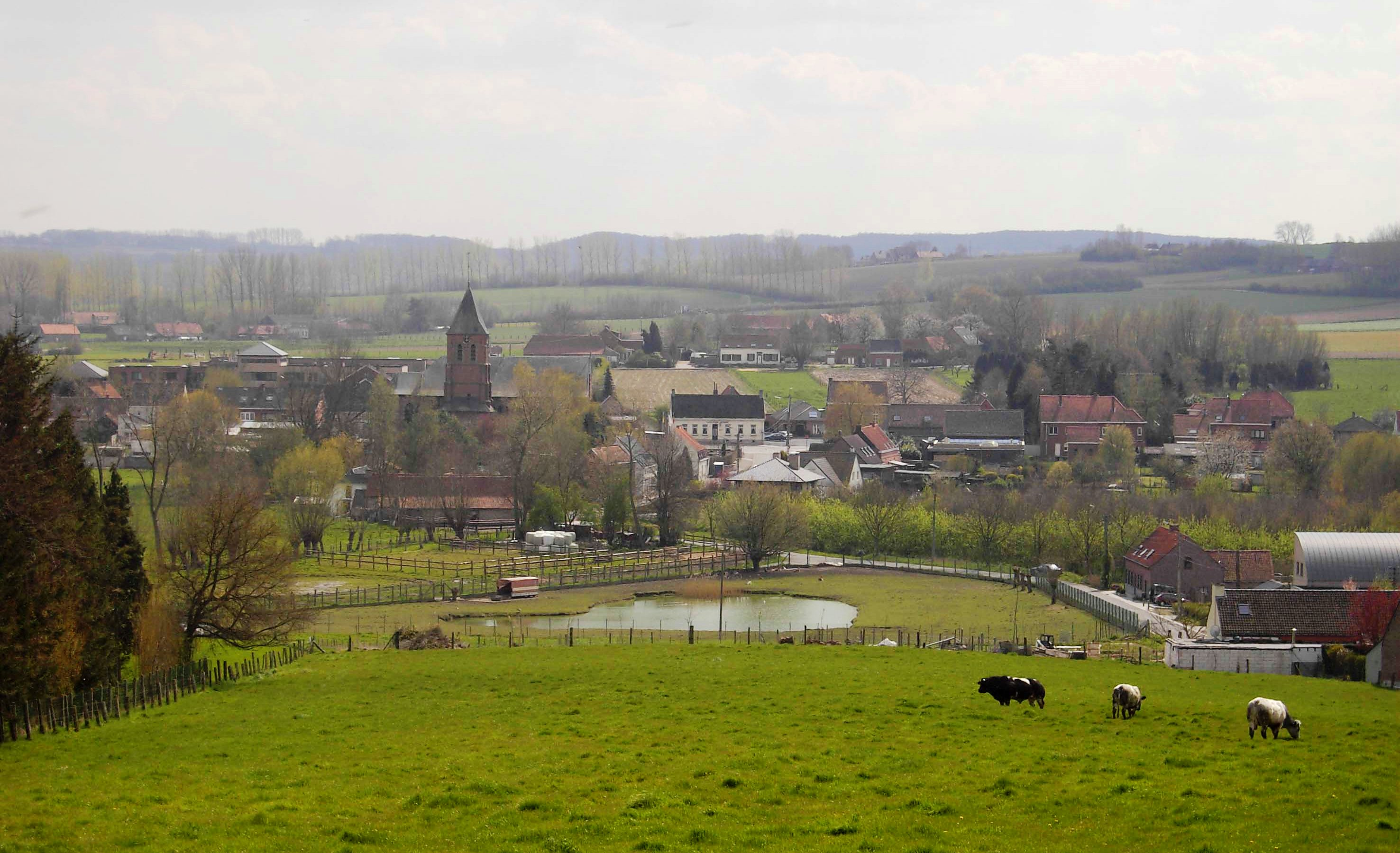
- Village of Maarke (2008)

- Location in Belgium
- Coordinates: 50°58′N 3°45′E
- Country: Belgium
- Region: Flemish Region
- Province: East Flanders
- Arrondissement: Oudenaarde
- Municipality: Ninove

Area
  - Total: 9.28 km^{2} (3.58 sq mi)

Population (2021)
  - Total: 968
  - Density: 104/km^{2} (270/sq mi)
- Time zone: CET

Maarke-Kerkem is a village in the Flemish Ardennes, the hilly southern part of the province of East Flanders, Belgium. It is formed by two hamlets, Maarke and Kerkem, and is incorporated in the municipality of Maarkedal. It is hosting the Saint Vincent Chapel, which was first erected around 1100.

In 1822, Maarke and Kerkem formed a municipality. The two villages are located in the hilly countryside of the Flemish Ardennes which varies in height from 30 to 100 metres. Maarke was first mentioned in 1063 and means "swampy settlement". In 1129, the parish became part of the Liessies Abbey. Kerkem means "settlement near a church", and developed in the Early Middle Ages. The municipality was merged into Maarkedal in 1977.

== Places of interest ==
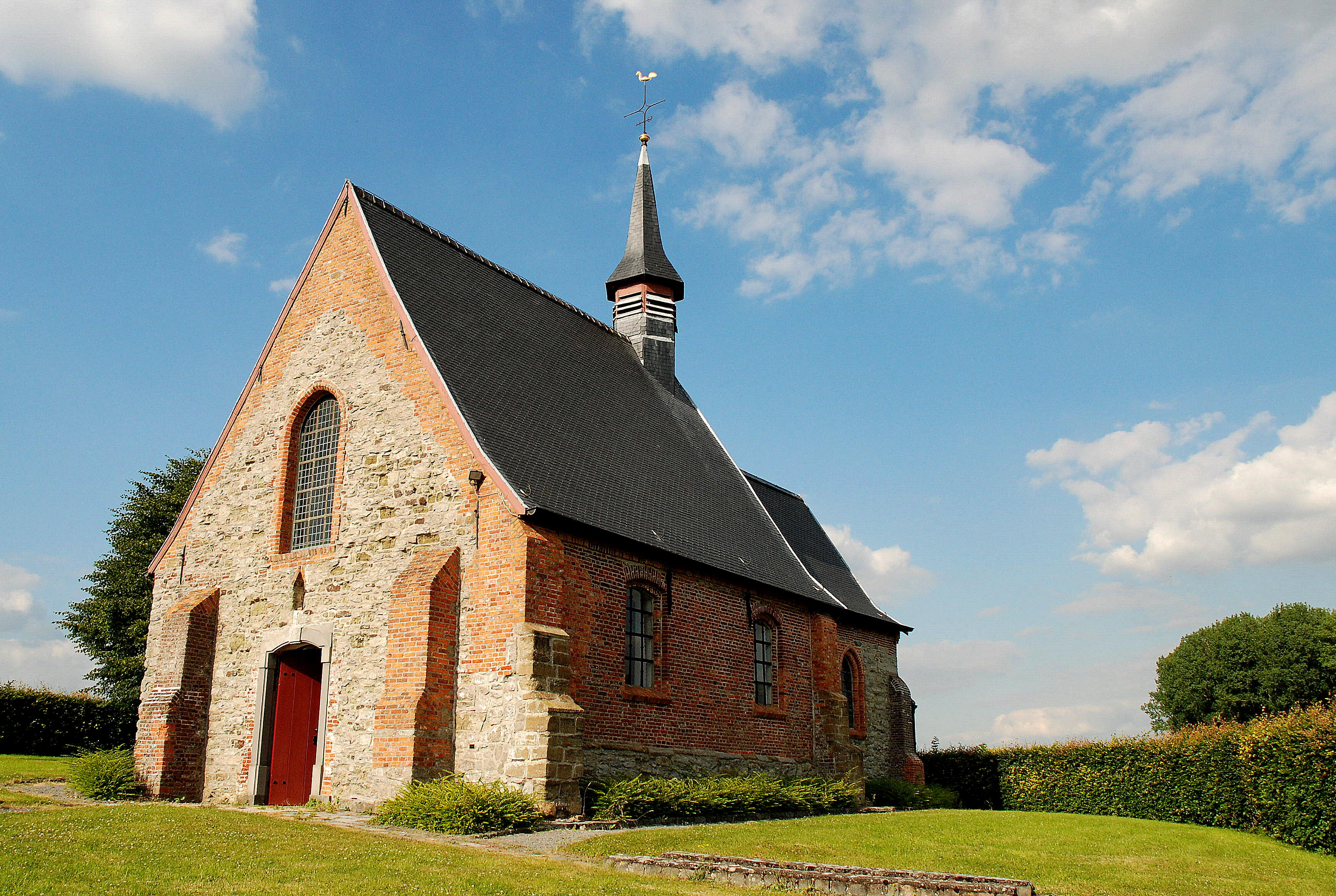
Saint Vincent Chapel of Maarke-Kerkem (2009)

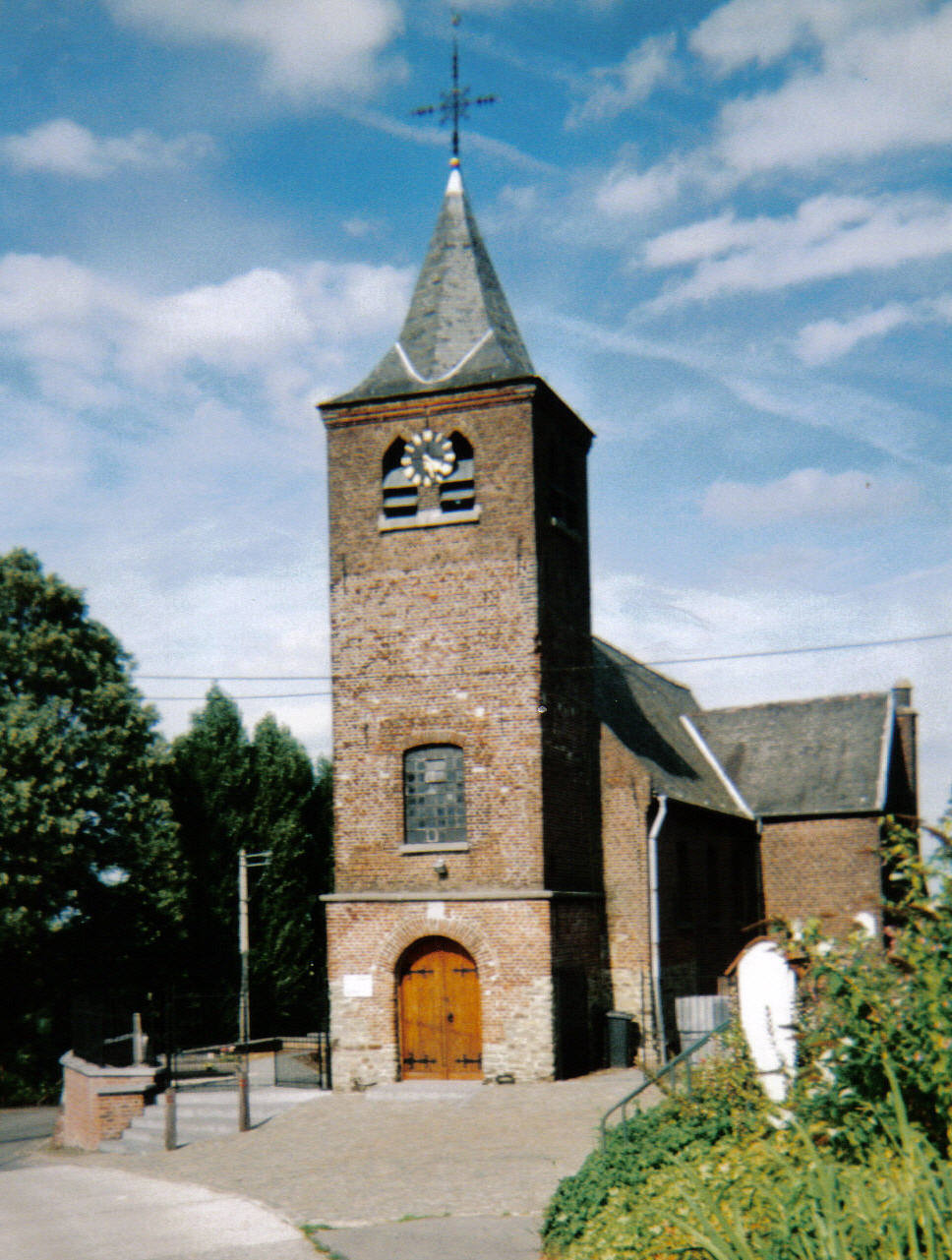
Church of Kerkem (2007)

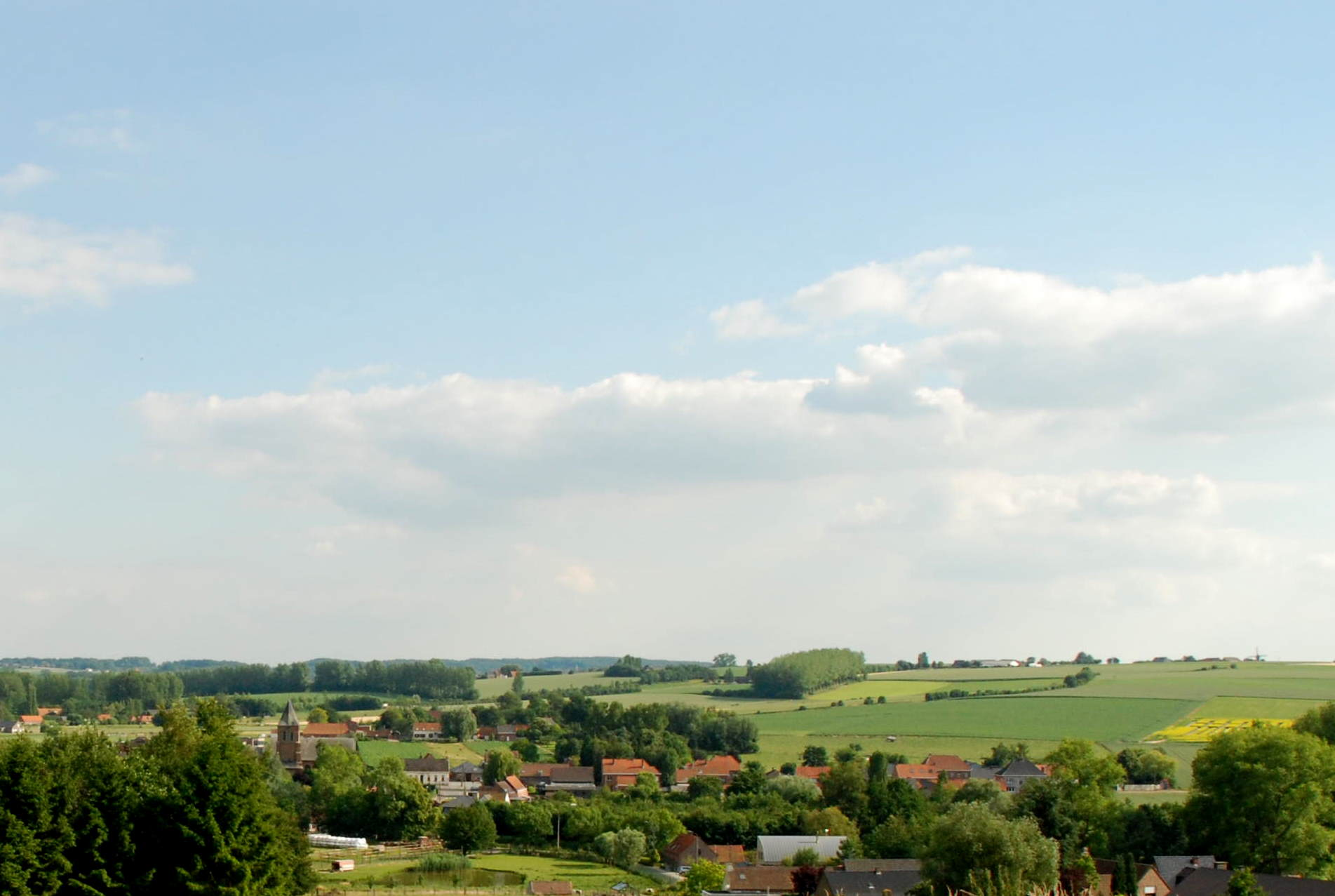
Countryside around Maarke-Kerkem (2009)

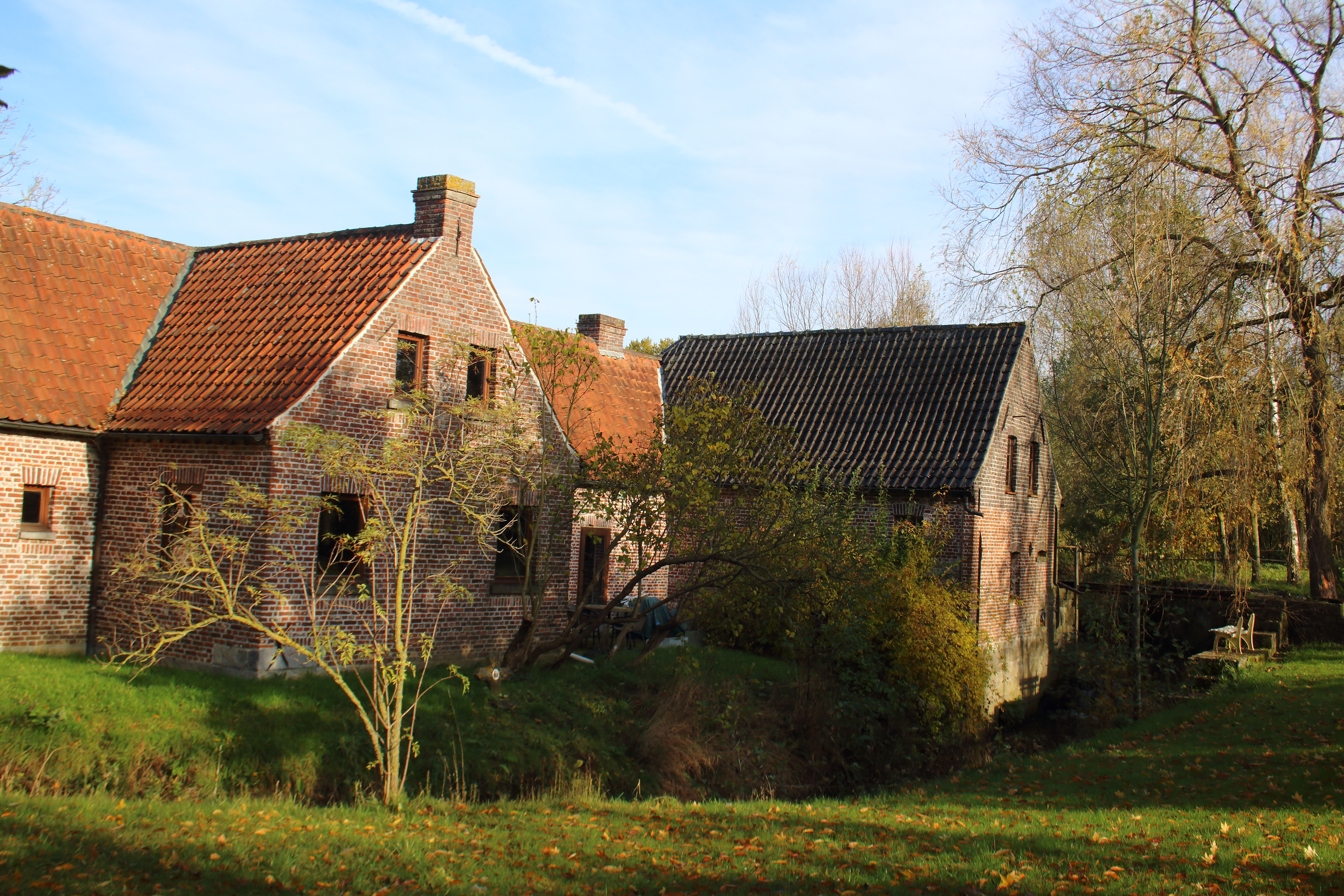
Romansmolen
