= Parike =

- Village
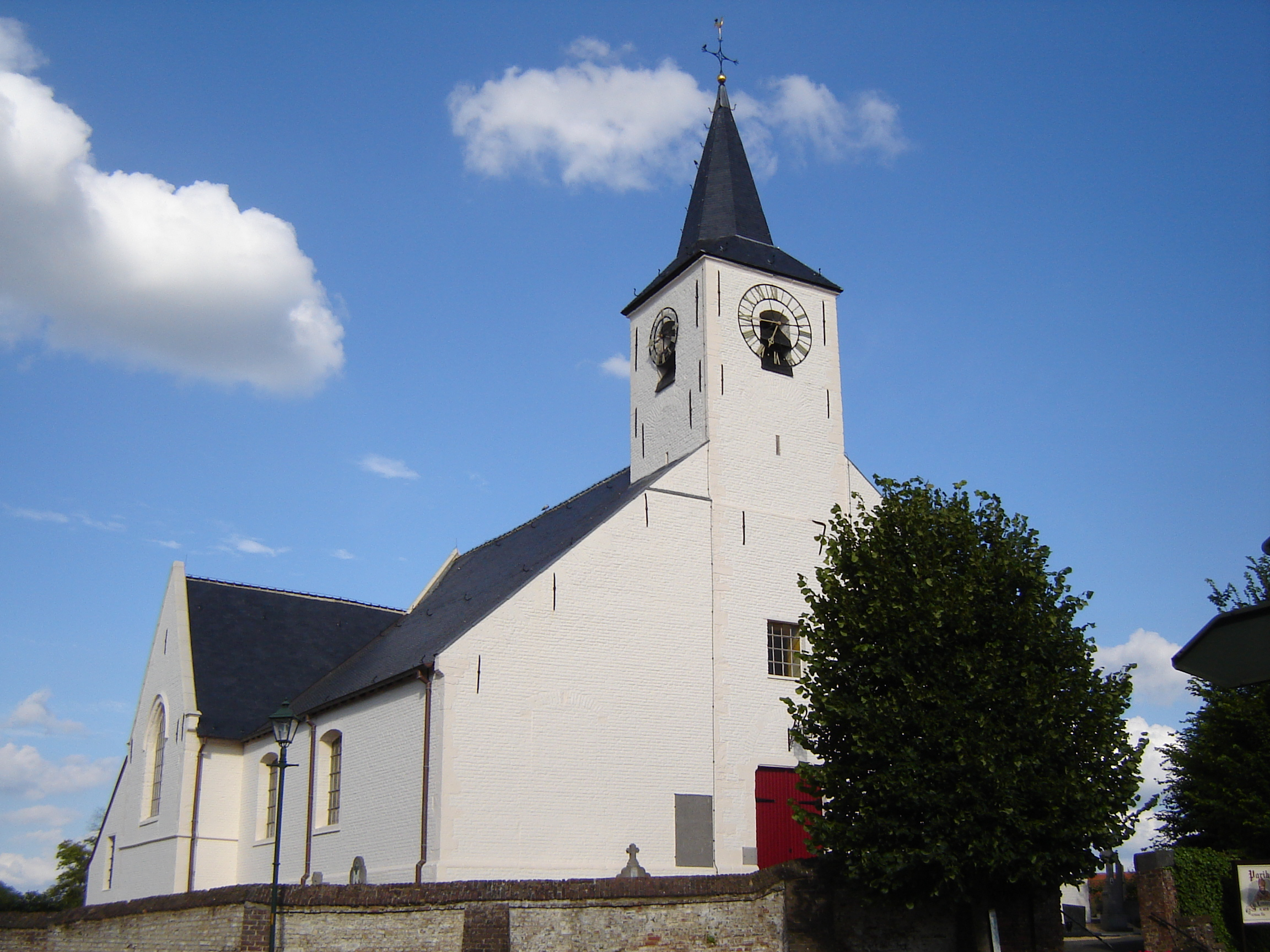
- St Lambertus Church

- Location in Belgium
- Coordinates: 50.7848°N 3.7971°E
- Country: Belgium
- Region: Flemish Region
- Province: East Flanders
- Municipality: Brakel

Area
  - Total: 3.48 km^{2} (1.34 sq mi)

Population (2021)
  - Total: 668
  - Density: 192/km^{2} (497/sq mi)
- Time zone: CET

Parike is a village and deelgemeente (sub-municipality) of the municipality of Brakel. It is located in the Denderstreek in the province of East Flanders in Belgium. It used to be an independent municipality until 1977 when it was merged into Brakel.

== Overview ==
The village was mentioned in 866 as Elsuth, and could mean area enclosed with spruce trees. In 1453, the village was burnt down by the citizens of Ghent during their war against Philip the Good. At the end of the winter, the Walmkebrand (Walmke Fire) is lit on the Parike Mountain, however that is probably an old heathen tradition. Parike used to be a heerlijkheid, and there is a remnant of a motte-and-bailey castle about 1 kilometre east of Parike.

The St Lambertus Church is a three aisled church with a small square tower. Unlike most churches it is oriented to the north. The church dates from the middle of the 18th century. In 2007, the church was extensively restored and the spire was renewed. Little is known about the origin of its predecessor. In 1589, the old church was damaged by the Geuzen, and the tower burnt down in 1603. The old church was restored several times, but remained dilapidated.

The municipality covered an area of 3.56 square kilometres (1.37 sq mi). In 1977, Parike was merged into the municipality of Brakel and became a deelgemeente.

== Gallery ==
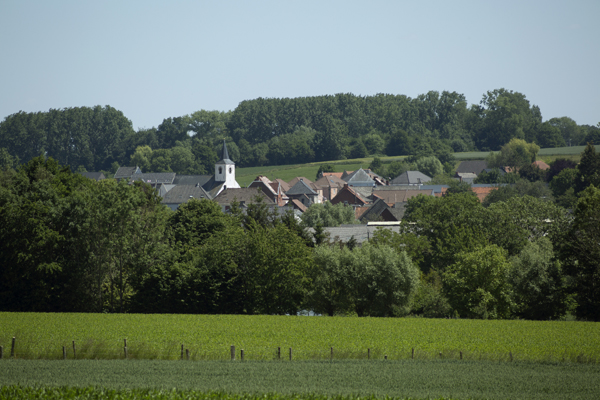
View on Parike

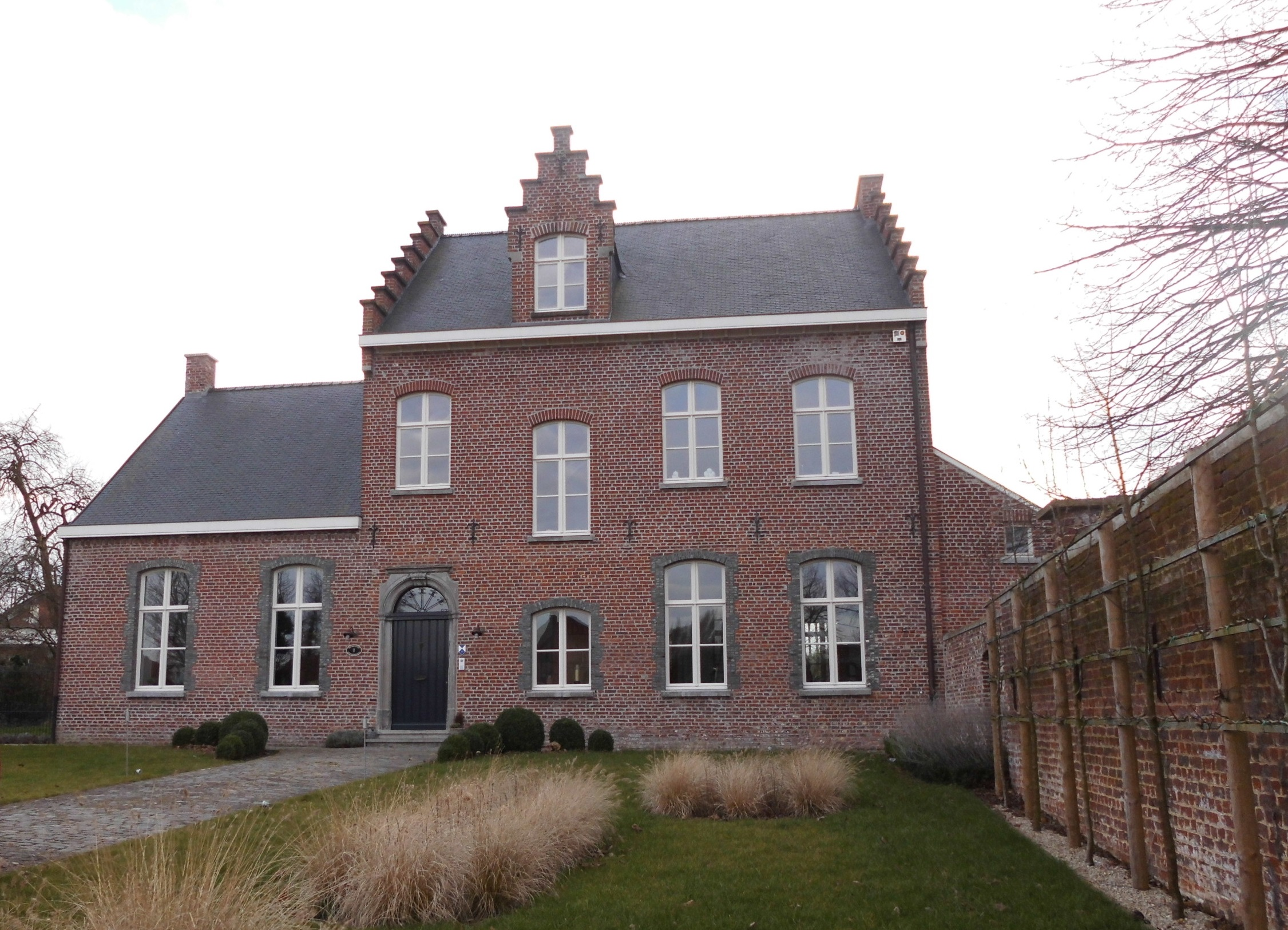
Clergy house

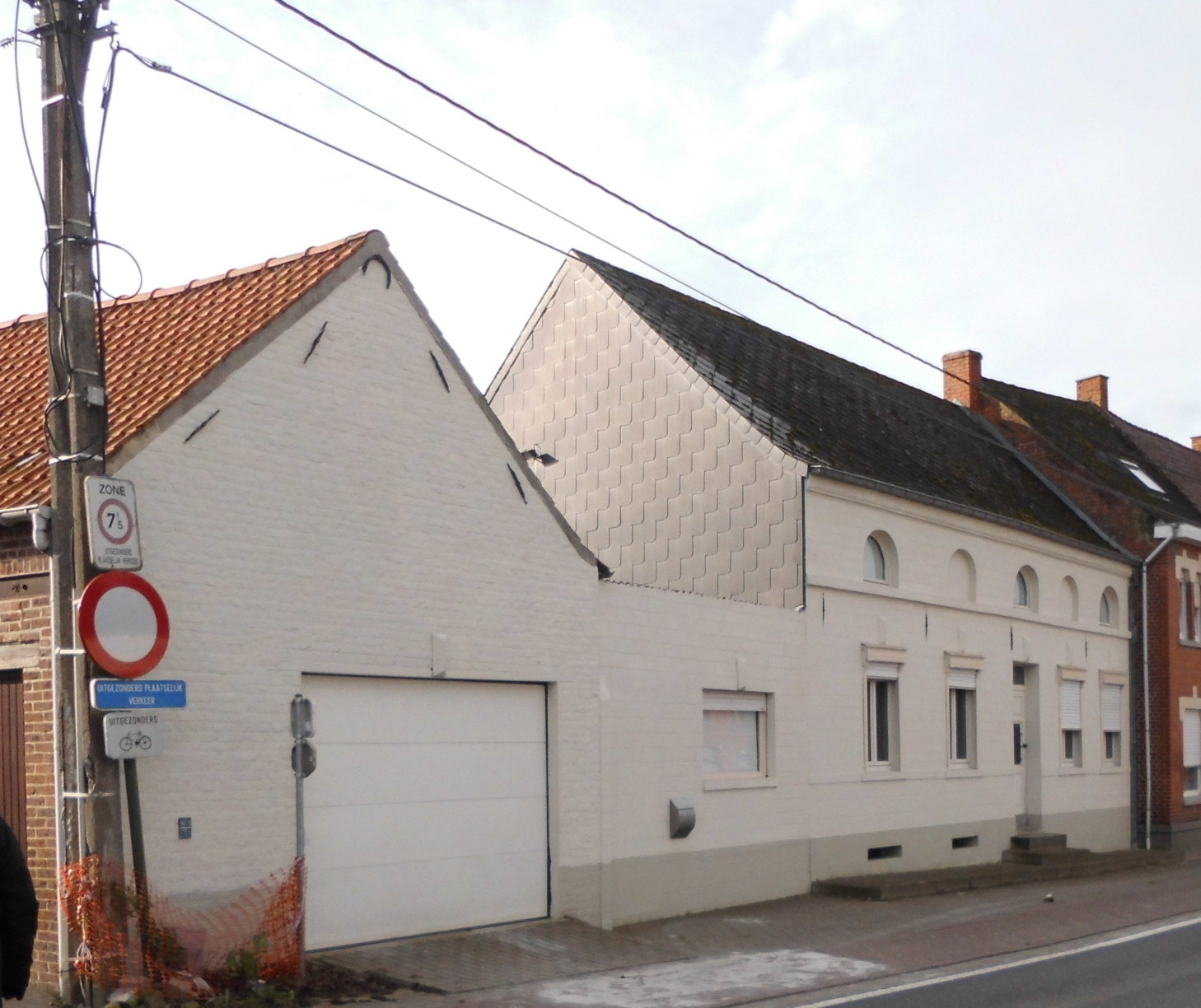
House in Parike

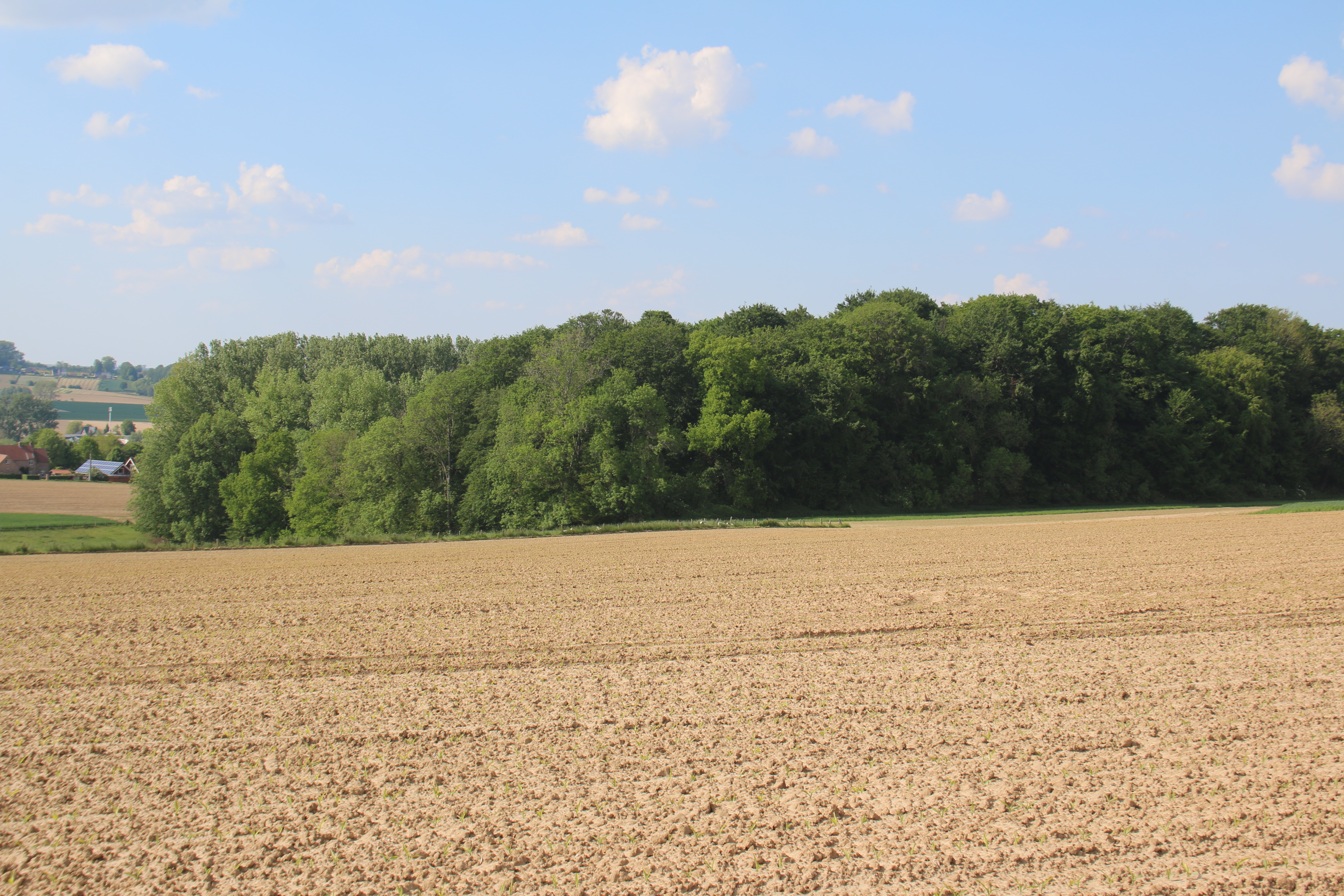
The forest of Parike
