= Bossuit =

Village in Belgium

Coordinates: 50°44′53″N 3°24′27″E

Coat of arms of Bossuit

Location of Bossuit within Avelgem

Bossuit is a village in the Belgian province of West Flanders and is a submunicipality of Avelgem. It was an independent municipality until 1977. It covers an area of 198 ha (490 acres) and had 441 inhabitants.

The Bossuit Castle is located in Bossuit.

== History ==
Bossuit was already inhabited during the Roman era, with archaeological finds of roof tile fragments and pottery shards along the Kortrijk-Bossuit canal). The oldest mention of the settlement is from 998. In a charter of 1038, the French king Henry I confirms the Ghent Saint Peter's Abbey in its rights and possessions, including the church with land in Bossuit.
