= Jan Verroken =

Belgian politician (1917–2020)

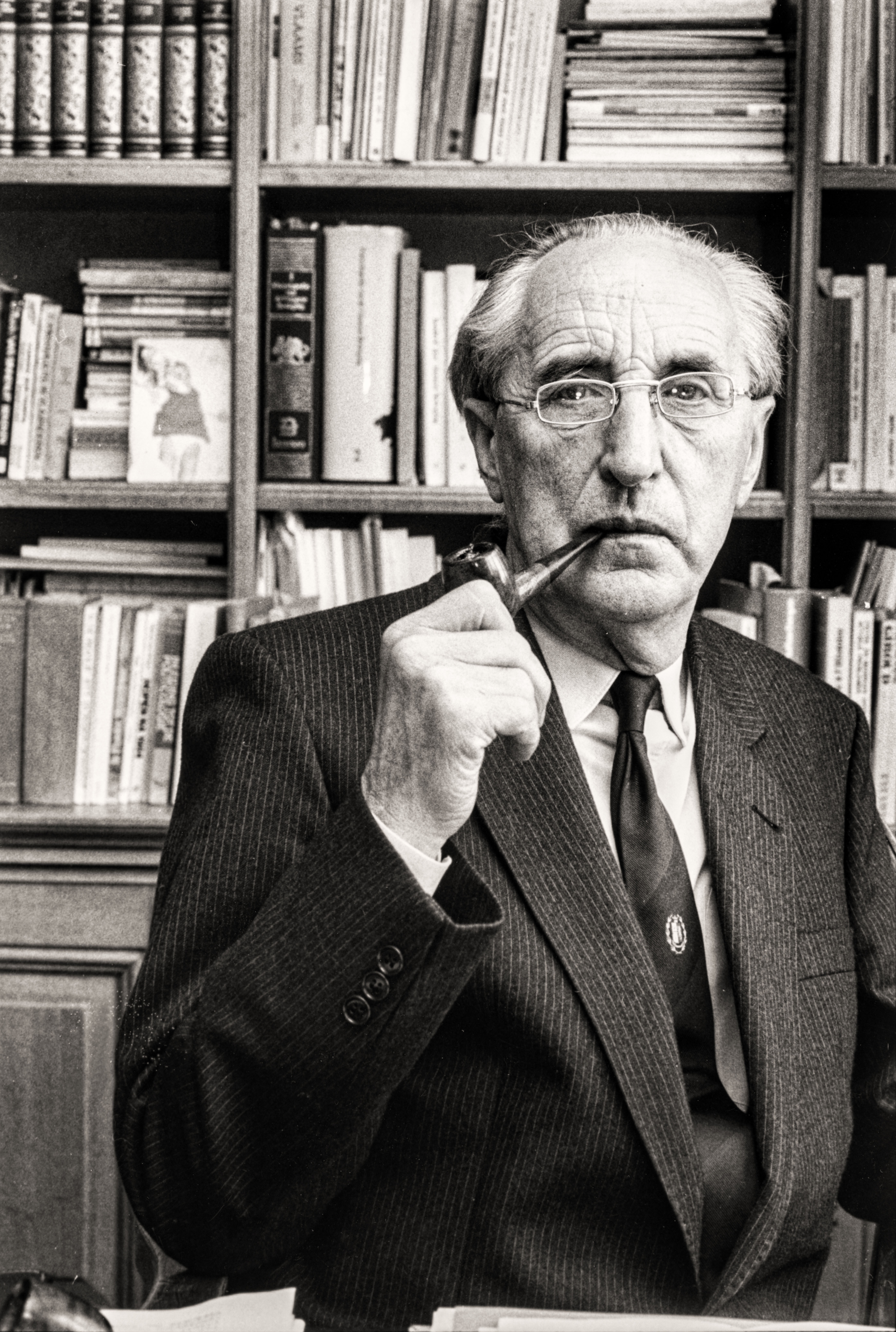
- Verroken in 1988

Member of the Belgian Parliament for Oudenaarde
- In office 1950–1981

Member of the European Parliament for the Dutch-speaking electoral college
- In office 17 July 1979 – 23 July 1984

Personal details
- Born: 30 January 1917 Melden, Belgium
- Died: 24 July 2020 (aged 103) Mechelen, Belgium
- Party: CDV

Jan Verroken (30 January 1917 – 24 July 2020) was a Belgian politician.

== Biography ==
Born on 30 January 1917, Verroken served as burgomaster of Oudenaarde, President of the Christelijke Volkspartij in the Belgian Parliament, and a Deputy for the Oudenaarde constituency. He was also a member of the European Parliament and served on the Benelux Parliament.

Verroken was detested in Wallonia, the francophone part of Belgium. During the Split of the Catholic University of Leuven Flemish students chanted "Walen buiten" (Walloons out), a slogan coined by Verroken. The university was split into the KU Leuven and the Université catholique de Louvain. In a 2016 interview with Pierre Havaux, Verroken minimized his role in these events, as well as downplaying the separatist tendency of Flemish demands, saying that there was "never in Flanders a project of form a separatist government, as was the case in Wallonia during the Royal Question".
