= Paul Tant =

Belgian politician (1945–2014)

Mayor of Kruishoutem
- In office 1977–2009

Member of the Chamber of Representatives
- In office 1981–1987

Member of the Senate
- In office 1989–1991

Member of the Chamber of Representatives
- In office 1991–2007

Personal details
- Born: 4 April 1945
- Died: 1 March 2014 (aged 68)
- Party: CD&V
- Education: Ghent University
- Occupation: Politician, professor

Paul Tant (4 April 1945 – 1 March 2014) was a Belgian politician. He was a member of Christen-Democratisch en Vlaams. He was mayor of Kruishoutem from 1977 until 2009.

He studied at Ghent University, where he earned a degree in political science. He was a longtime professor at Ipsoc. He was mayor of Kruishoutem from 1977 until 2009. Tant served in the Chamber of Representatives from 1981 to 1987 and again from 1991 until 2007. Between his two terms in the Chamber of Representatives he served from 1989 to 1991 in the Senate.

He died at the age of 68 on 1 March 2014.
