= Avelgem =

- Municipality
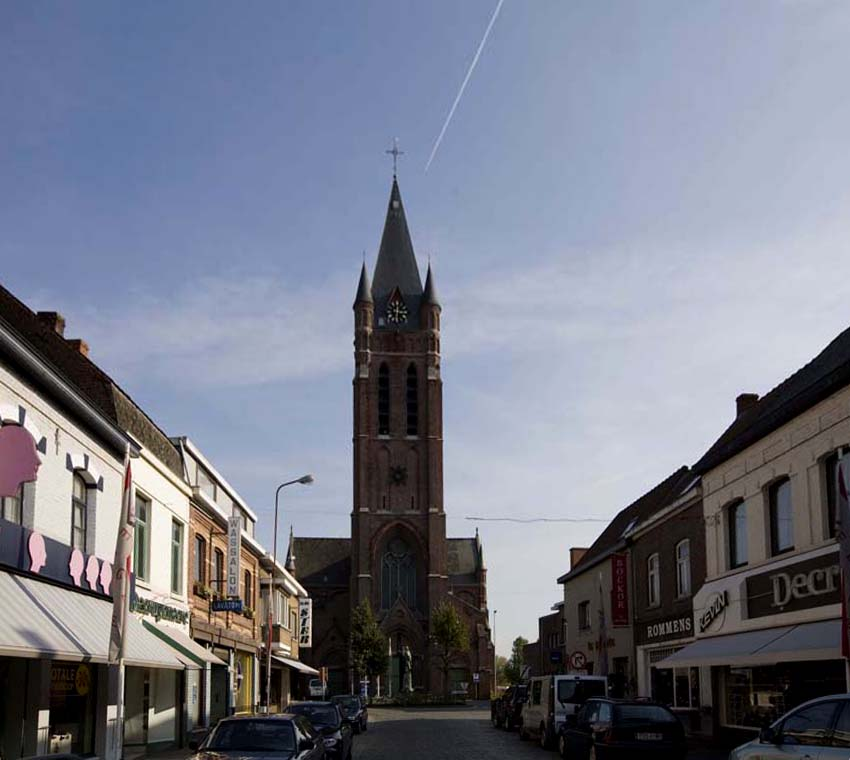

- Flag Coat of arms

- Location of Avelgem in West-Flanders
- Interactive map of Avelgem
- Location in Belgium
- Coordinates: 50°46′N 03°26′E
- Country: Belgium
- Community: Flemish Community
- Region: Flemish Region
- Province: West Flanders
- Arrondissement: Kortrijk

Government
  - Mayor: Lut Deseyn (Gemeentebelangen)
  - Governing parties: Gemeentebelangen, Tandem

Area
  - Total: 22.12 km^{2} (8.54 sq mi)

Population (2018-01-01)
  - Total: 10,065
  - Density: 455.0/km^{2} (1,178/sq mi)
- Postal codes: 8580-8583
- NIS code: 34003
- Area codes: 056
- Website: www.avelgem.be

Avelgem (Dutch pronunciation: [ˈaːvəlɣɛm]; West Flemish: Oavelgem [ˈɒːvəlɦæm]) is a municipality located in the Belgian province of West Flanders. The municipality comprises the towns of Avelgem proper, Bossuit, Kerkhove, Outrijve and Waarmaarde. On January 1, 2006, Avelgem had a total population of 9,457. The total area is 21.75 km^{2} which gives a population density of 435 inhabitants per km^{2}.

It has a famous building named 'Spikkerelle', where people can watch movies, theater, exhibitions and there's a room which can be organized for events.

== Climate ==
Climate data for Avelgem (1991-2020)
Month	Jan	Feb	Mar	Apr	May	Jun	Jul	Aug	Sep	Oct	Nov	Dec	Year
Mean daily maximum °C (°F)	6.9 (44.4)	7.9 (46.2)	11.5 (52.7)	15.5 (59.9)	18.9 (66.0)	21.7 (71.1)	23.9 (75.0)	23.8 (74.8)	20.4 (68.7)	15.7 (60.3)	10.6 (51.1)	7.3 (45.1)	15.3 (59.6)
Daily mean °C (°F)	4.2 (39.6)	4.6 (40.3)	7.3 (45.1)	10.2 (50.4)	13.8 (56.8)	16.7 (62.1)	18.8 (65.8)	18.5 (65.3)	15.4 (59.7)	11.7 (53.1)	7.6 (45.7)	4.7 (40.5)	11.1 (52.0)
Mean daily minimum °C (°F)	1.4 (34.5)	1.3 (34.3)	3.1 (37.6)	5.0 (41.0)	8.7 (47.7)	11.7 (53.1)	13.7 (56.7)	13.2 (55.8)	10.4 (50.7)	7.7 (45.9)	4.6 (40.3)	2.1 (35.8)	6.9 (44.4)
Average precipitation mm (inches)	71.6 (2.82)	59.1 (2.33)	57.2 (2.25)	44.1 (1.74)	59.0 (2.32)	69.3 (2.73)	74.4 (2.93)	81.3 (3.20)	66.6 (2.62)	67.6 (2.66)	85.0 (3.35)	91.1 (3.59)	826.3 (32.54)
Average precipitation days (≥ 1 mm)	12.8	11.5	10.7	9.1	10	10.1	10	10.4	10.3	11.4	13.7	14.2	134.2
Mean monthly sunshine hours	62	80	135	191	217	219	224	211	165	123	69	54	1,750
Mean daily sunshine hours	2	2.9	4.4	6.4	7	7.3	7.2	6.8	5.5	4	2.3	1.7	4.8
Source: RMI

== Notable people ==
- Bert De Graeve, (b. 1955 in Avelgem), businessman
- Marc Demeyer, (b. 1950 in Avelgem), cyclist
