= Bissegem =

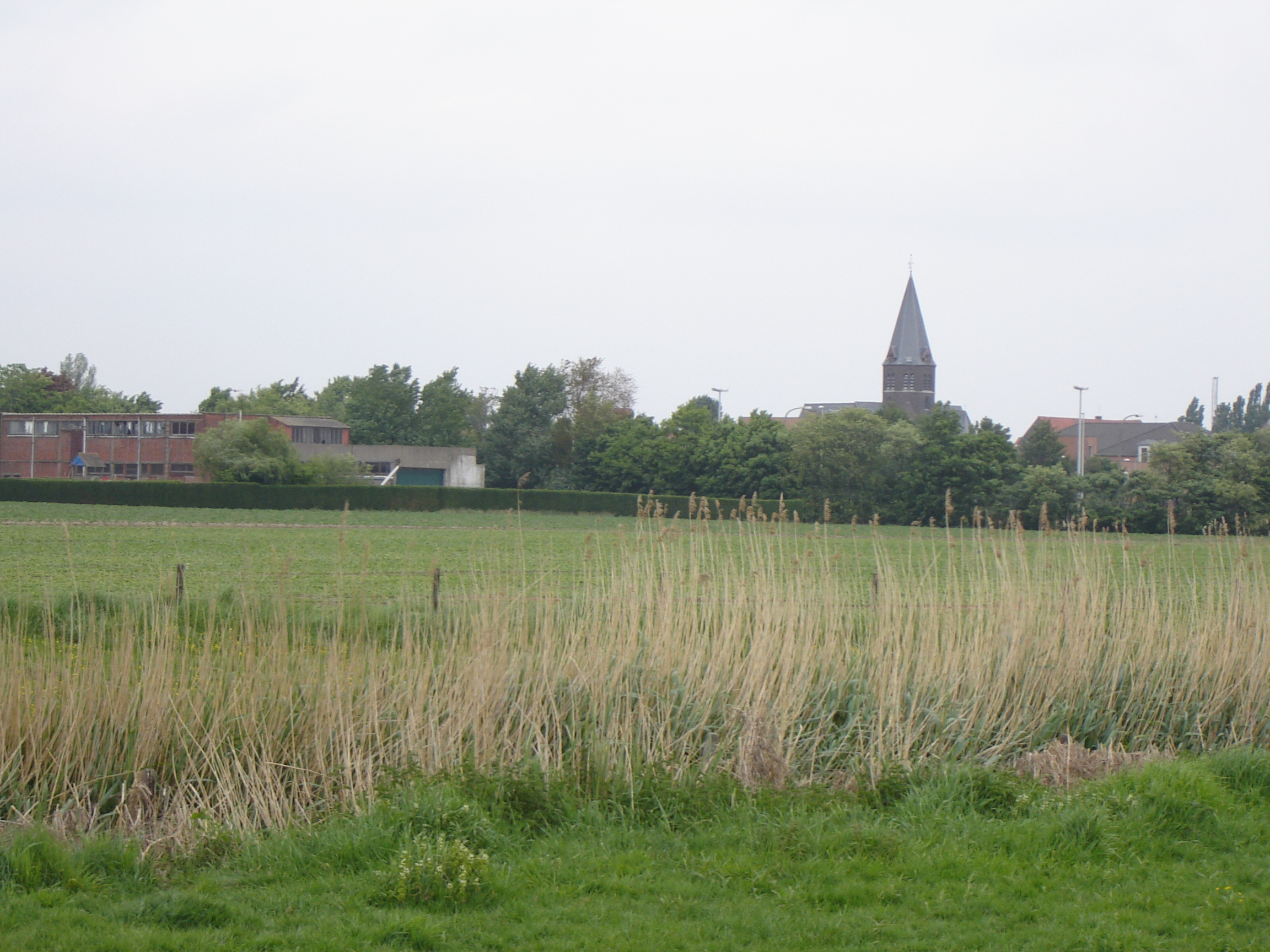

- Location in Belgium
- Coordinates: 50°49′N 3°13′E
- Country: Belgium
- Province: West Flanders
- Municipality: Kortrijk

Area
  - Total: 1.328363 sq mi (3.440444 km^{2})

Population (2007)
  - Total: 15,533
- Time zone: UTC+1 (CET)
  - Summer (DST): UTC+2 (CEST)
- 8501: 8501
- Area code: 056
- Website: www.kortrijk.be

Bissegem is a sub-municipality of the city of Kortrijk, Belgium. It is part of the urban area of this city. As of 2020, it had a population of 5,283.

It also has a railway station, with trains to leper, Kortrijk, Dendermonde, Sint-Niklaas and Brussels.

== Gallery ==
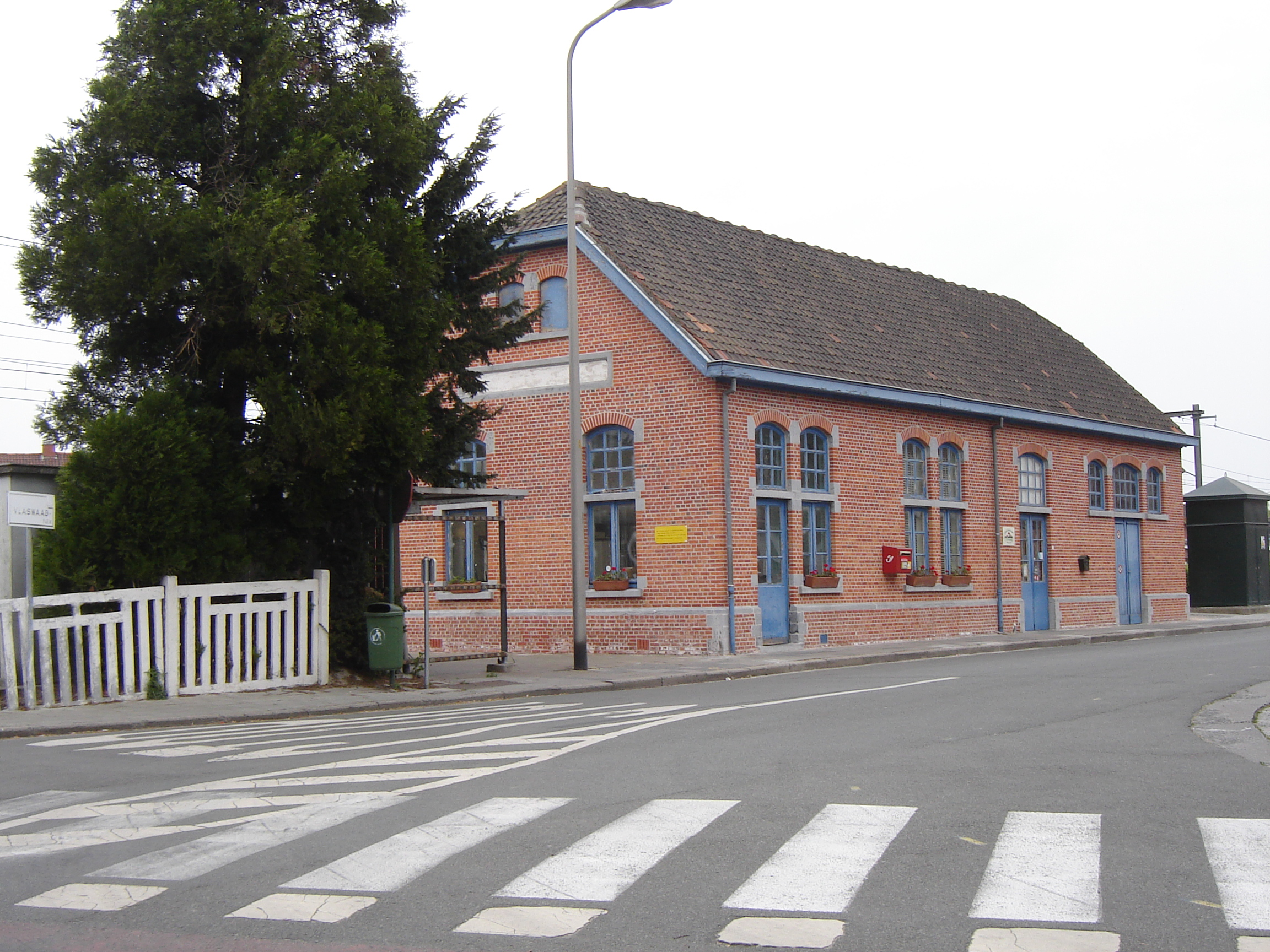
Train station in Bissegem

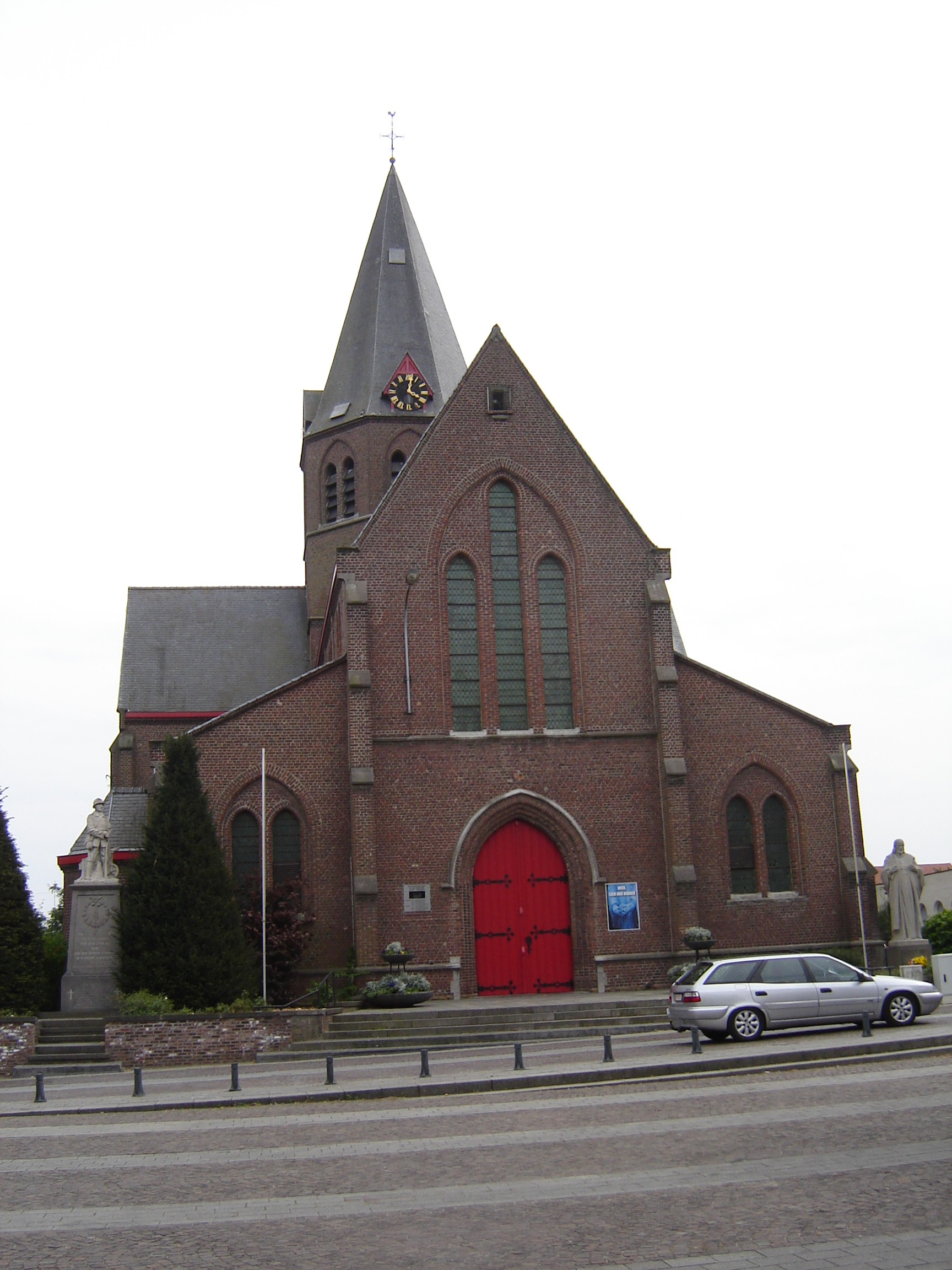
Saint-Audomarus church in Bissegem
