= European route E403 =

Road in trans-European E-road network

E403

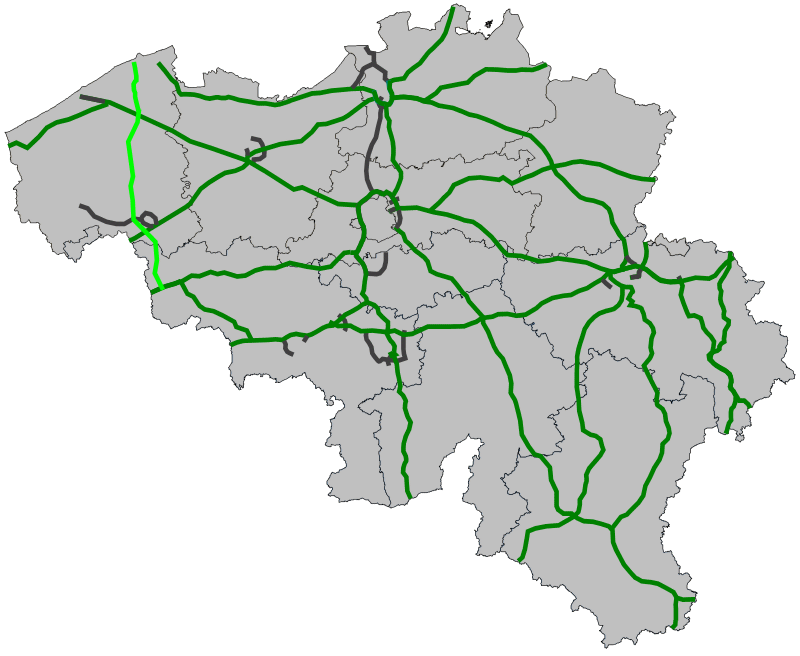
- E-roads in Belgium with E403 in bright green

Major junctions
- North end: Zeebrugge (Belgium)
- South end: Tournai (Belgium)

Location
- Countries: Belgium

Highway system
- International E-road network; A Class; B Class

The European route E 403 is a European route connecting the Belgian towns of Zeebrugge and Tournai. This north-south route runs entirely on Belgian territory and falls together with the Belgian roads N31 and A17.

European route E 403 passes through the following towns and cities:

Zeebrugge - Bruges - Torhout - Roeselare - Kortrijk - Tournai

Near Bruges there's a connection with the E 40 and near Kortrijk with the E 17.

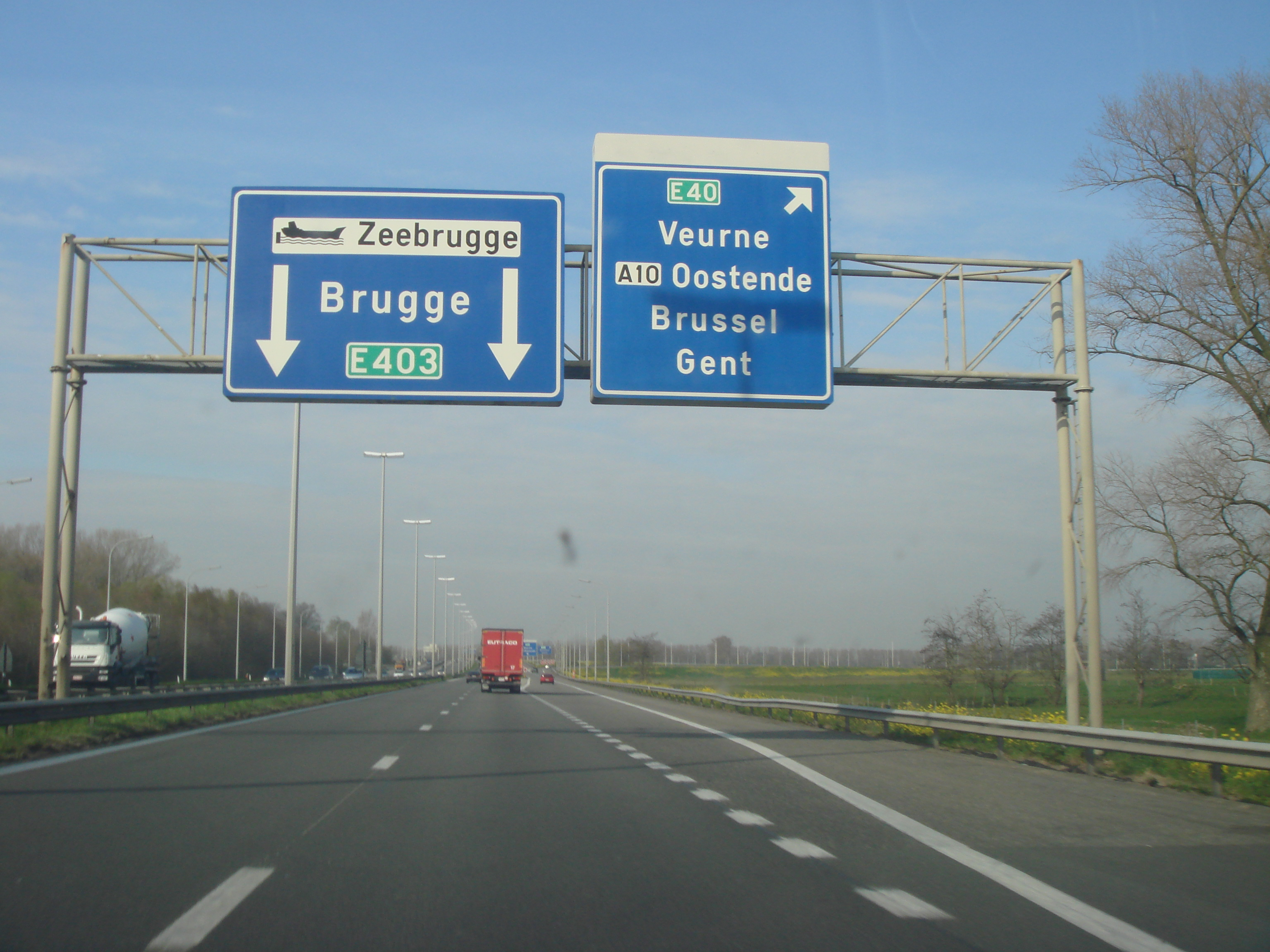
The E403 near the interchange with the E40 in Bruges.

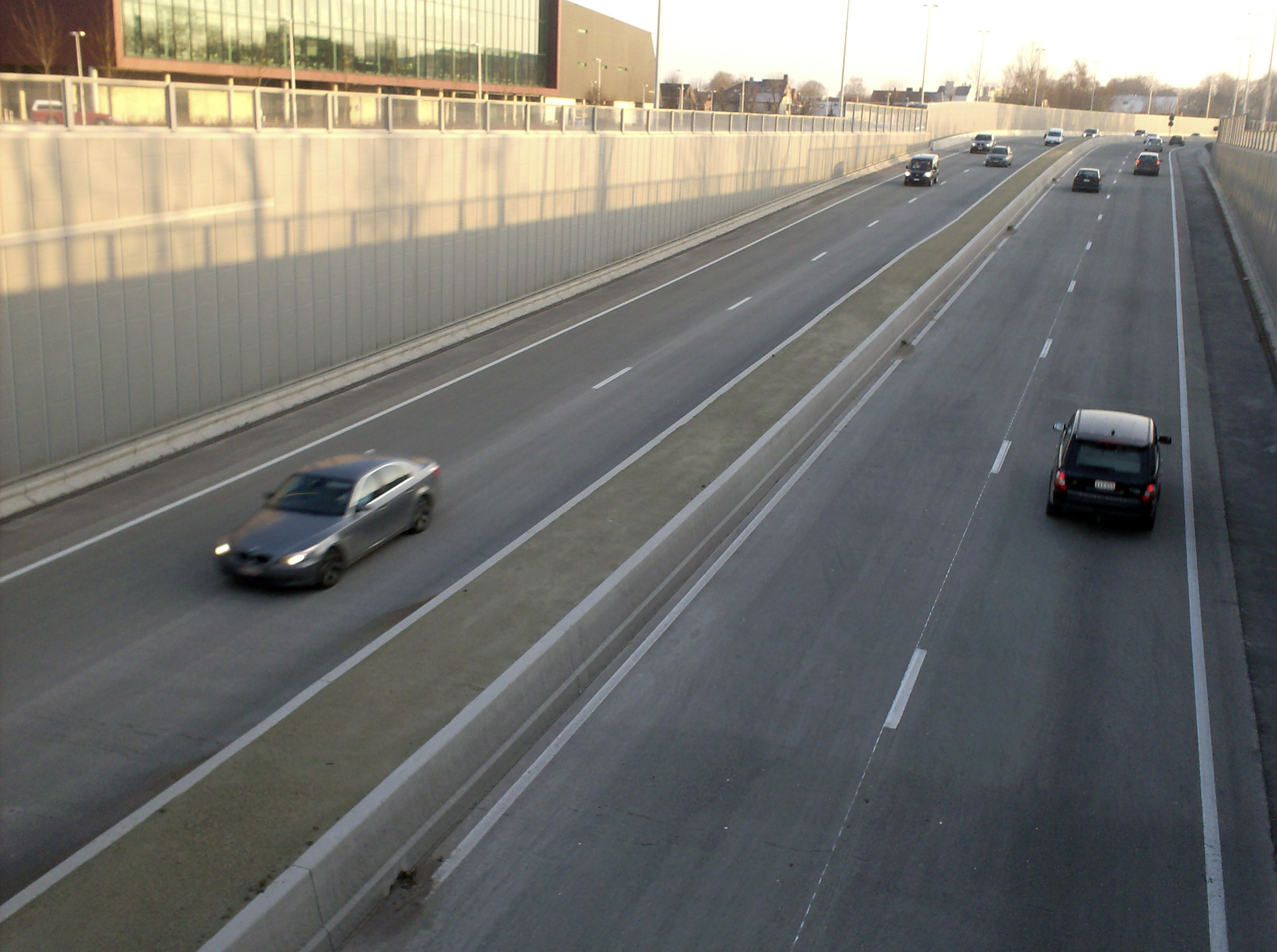
The E403 in Sint-Michiels, Bruges.
