= Maarkedal =

Municipality in the Belgian province of East Flanders

- Municipality
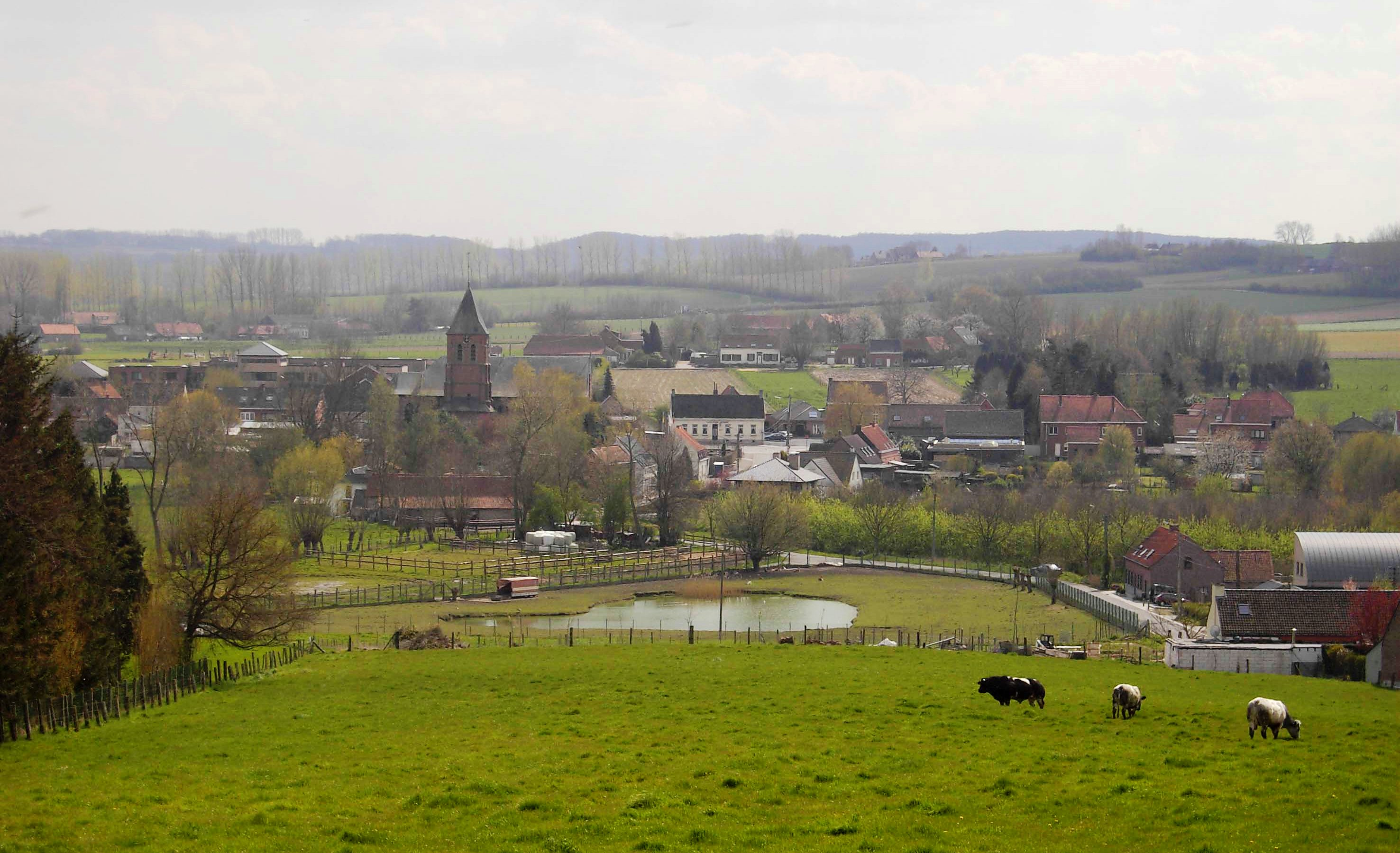
- Maarke (Maarke-Kerkem)

- Flag Coat of arms

- Location of Maarkedal in East Flanders
- Interactive map of Maarkedal
- Location in Belgium
- Coordinates: 50°48′N 03°37′E
- Country: Belgium
- Community: Flemish Community
- Region: Flemish Region
- Province: East Flanders
- Arrondissement: Oudenaarde

Government
  - Mayor: Joris Nachtergaele (N-VA)
  - Governing parties: N-VA, Open Vld Maarkedal

Area
  - Total: 46.15 km^{2} (17.82 sq mi)

Population (2018-01-01)
  - Total: 6,338
  - Density: 137.3/km^{2} (355.7/sq mi)
- Postal codes: 9680, 9681, 9688
- NIS code: 45064
- Area codes: 055
- Website: www.maarkedal.be

Maarkedal (Dutch pronunciation: [ˈmaːrkədɑl]) is a municipality located in the Belgian province of East Flanders. The municipality comprises the towns of Etikhove, Maarke-Kerkem, Nukerke and Schorisse, and part of the hamlet of Louise-Marie. In 2021, Maarkedal had a total population of 6,362. The total area is 45.63 km^{2}.
