= Wortegem =

- Village
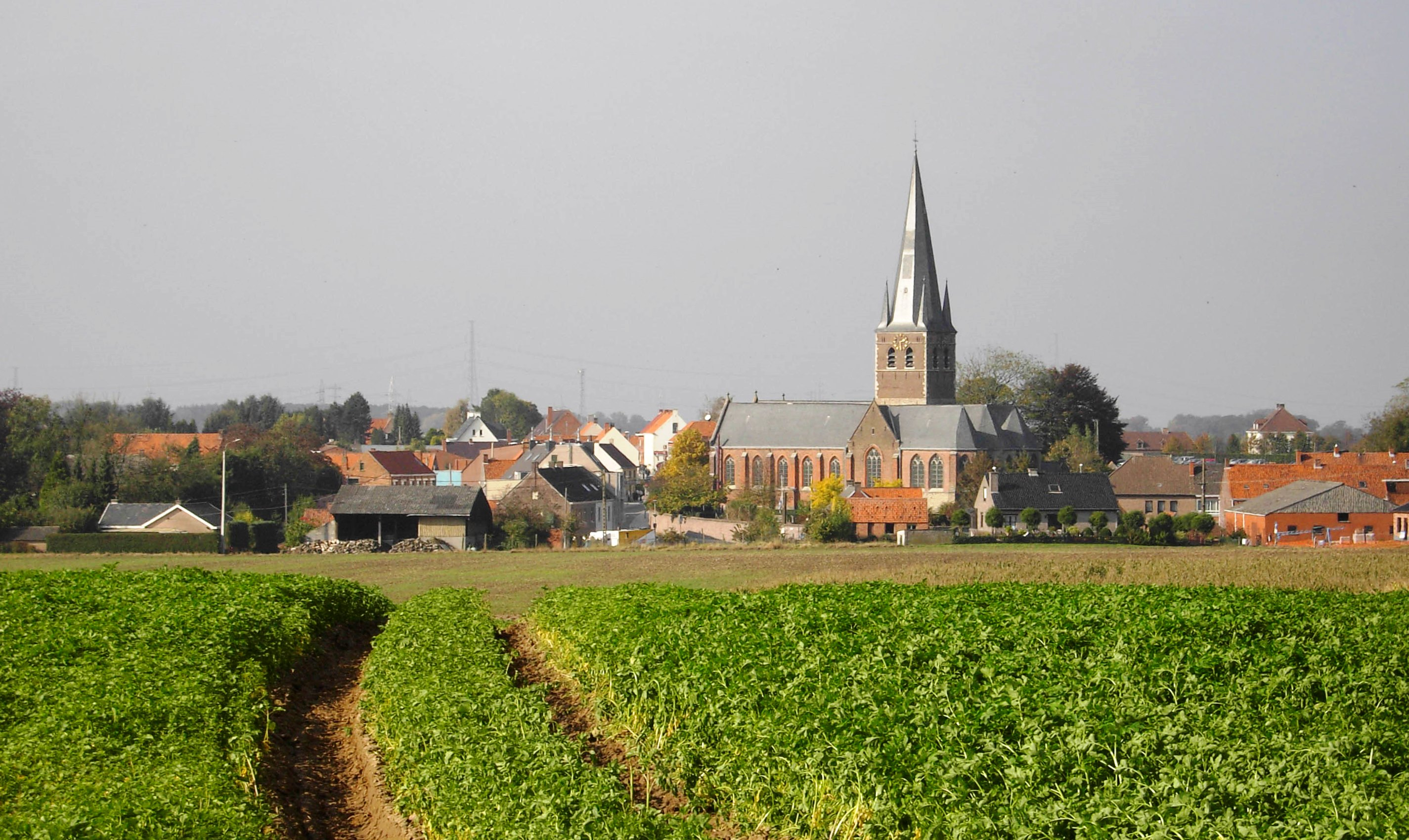
- View on Wortegem

- Location in Belgium
- Coordinates: 50.8519°N 3.5106°E
- Country: Belgium
- Region: Flemish Region
- Province: East Flanders
- Arrondissement: Oudenaarde
- Municipality: Wortegem-Petegem

Area
  - Total: 15.78 km^{2} (6.09 sq mi)

Population (2021)
  - Total: 2,064
  - Density: 130.8/km^{2} (338.8/sq mi)
- Time zone: CET

Wortegem is a village and seat of the municipality of Wortegem-Petegem in the Belgian province of East Flanders. It is located about 17 kilometres (11 mi) east of Kortrijk.

== Geography ==
Wortegem is located in a hilly part of Flanders and varies in height from 25 metres (82 ft) to 82.5 metres (271 ft). The village is located on the western edge of the Flemish Ardennes.

== History ==
The village was first mentioned as Uurattingem in 964, and means "settlement of the people of Wardo (person)". Wortegem was a heerlijkheid, but used to be overshadowed by neighbouring Petegem-aan-de-Schelde. The village developed on the road from Oudenaarde to Kortrijk. Wortegem industrialised in the early 19th century, but started to decline in the late 19th century. In the 20th century, it developed into a commuter's settlement.

Wortegem was an independent municipality. In 1970, it was merged into Wortegem-Petegem.

== Sights ==
The Onze-Lieve-Vrouw Geboorte and Sint-Rochus Church is a three-aisled church. The choir and lower part of the tower contain 13th century elements. The tower was enlarged during the 15th century, and the church was enlarged between 1827 and 1828. The church was redesigned in Gothic Revival style between 1905 and 1909. In 2019, it was decided to decommission the church, and convert it into a multi-functional community centre. A part of the church will retain its religious function and a silent room will be added.

The former grist and oil mill Boonzakmolen was built in 1785 as a replacement of a wooden mill which dated before 1410. In 1904, a steam engine was installed, but it remained wind powered as well. In 1946, a sail broke and inner workings were dismantled the next year. In 1992, it was restored and converted into a 5 story building. It is nowadays used as a holiday home.

Wortegem was known for Wortegemsen, a lemon jenever with sugar, however the distillery was sold to Filliers in 2009, and the production moved to Deinze.

== Gallery ==
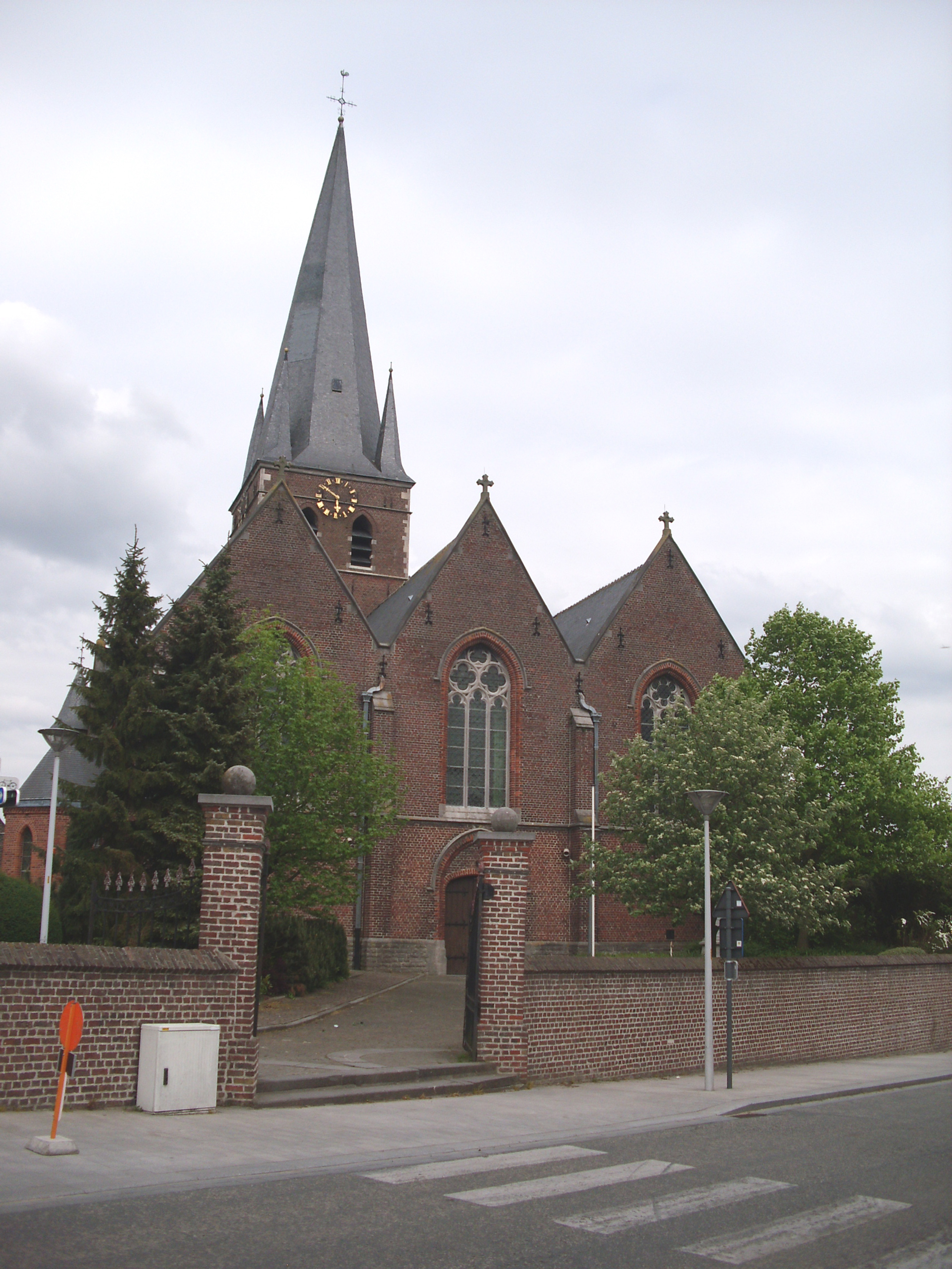
Onze-Lieve-Vrouw Geboorte and Sint-Rochus Church

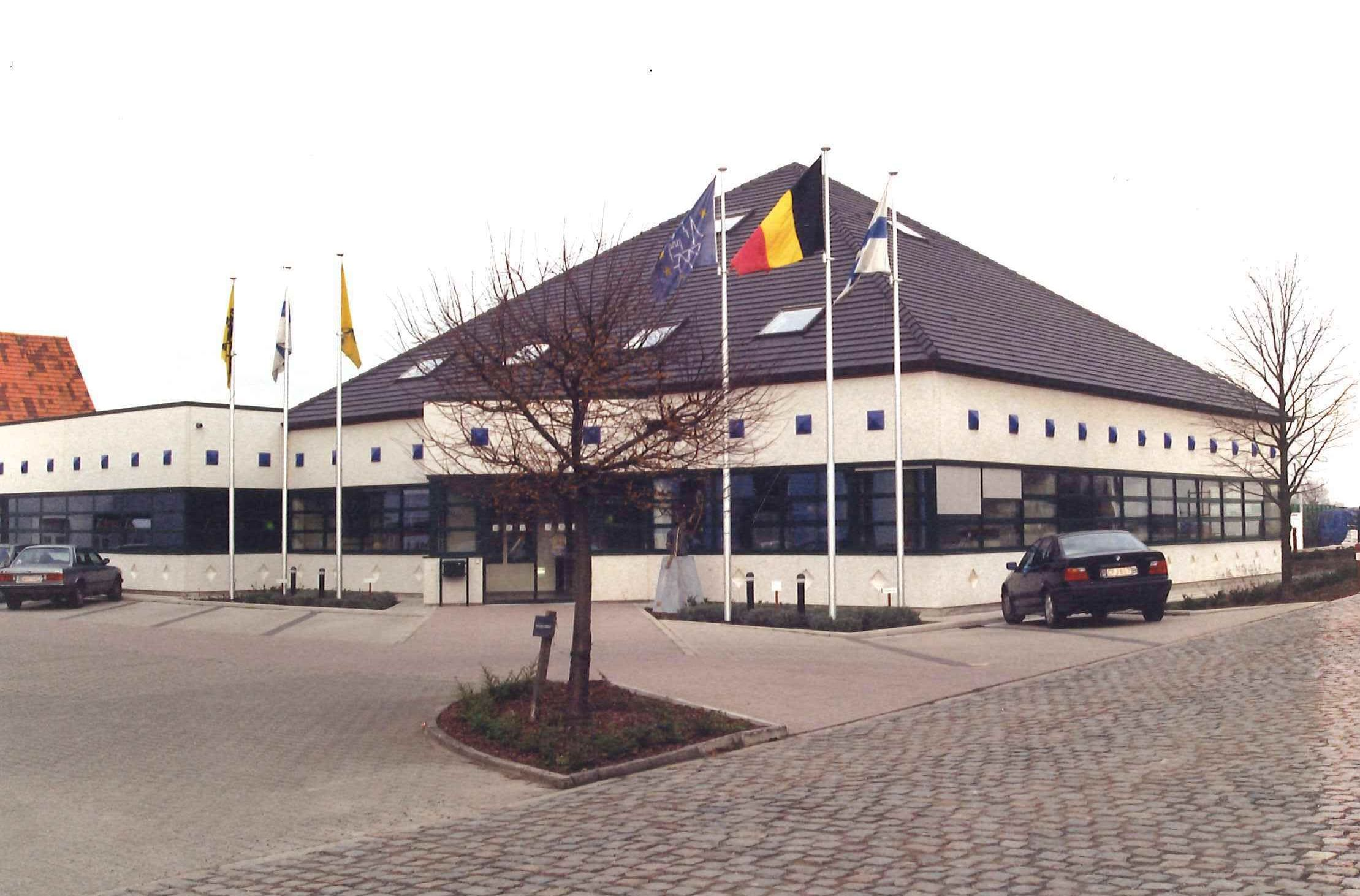
New town hall

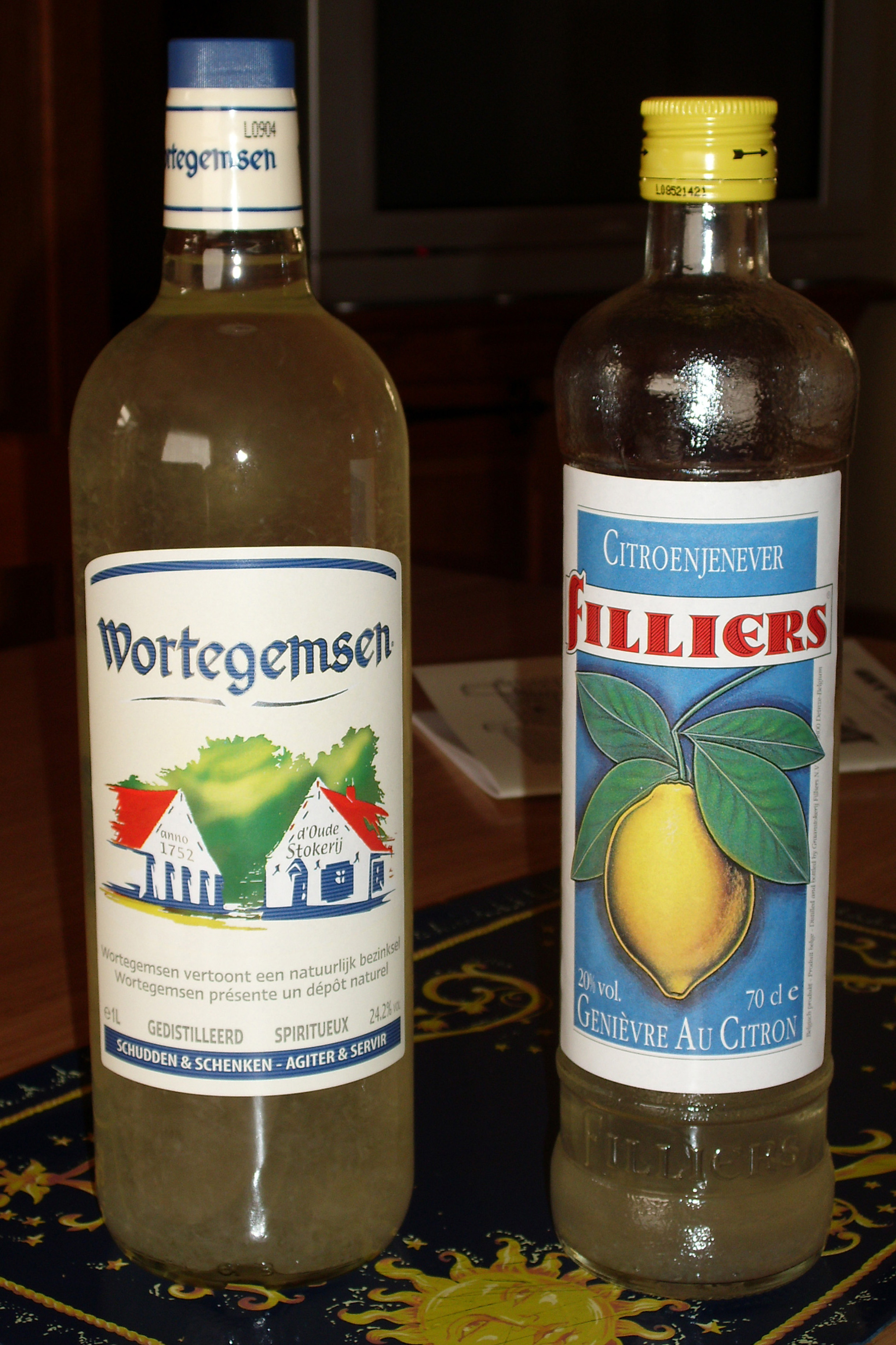
Wortegemsen and its former competitor Filliers

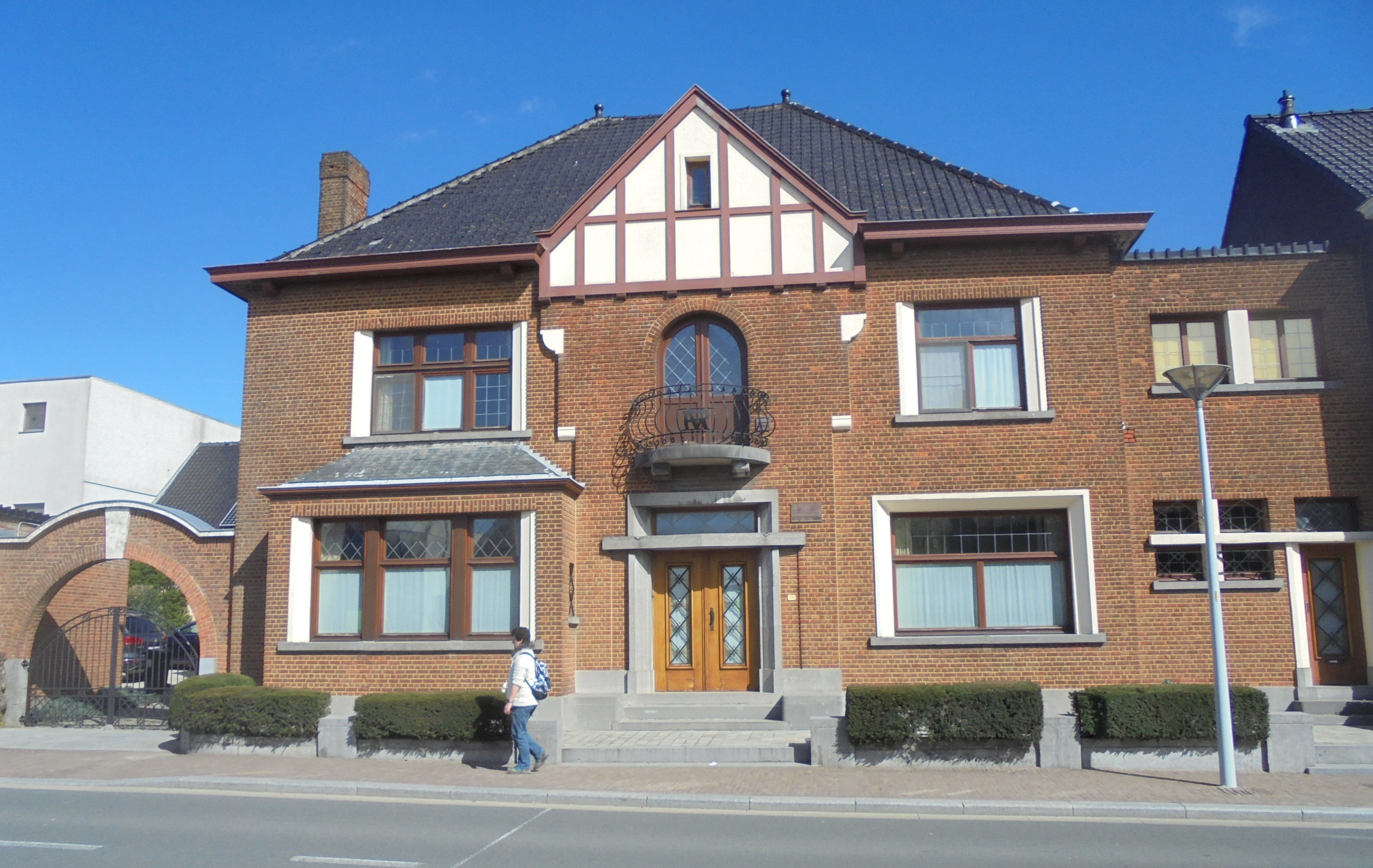
Birth house of Hector Plancquaert
