= Moregem =

- Village
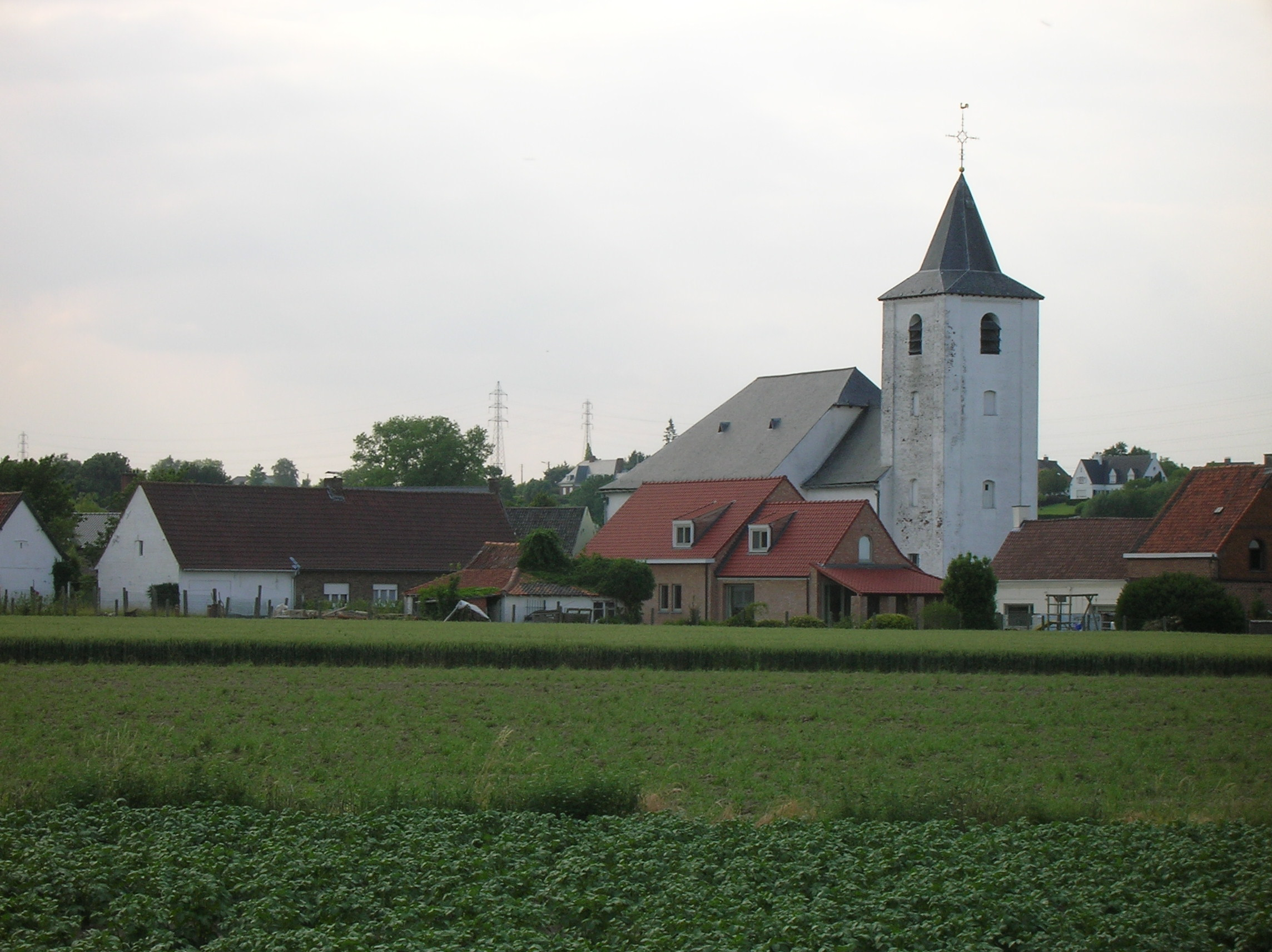
- Sint-Pietersstoel Church

- Location in Belgium
- Coordinates: 50°51′01″N 3°33′38″E
- Country: Belgium
- Region: Flemish Region
- Province: East Flanders
- Arrondissement: Oudenaarde
- Municipality: Wortegem-Petegem

Area
  - Total: 4.12 km^{2} (1.59 sq mi)

Population (2021)
  - Total: 419
  - Density: 102/km^{2} (263/sq mi)
- Time zone: CET

Moregem is a village in the municipality of Wortegem-Petegem located in the Belgian province of East Flanders. The village has as European sister village the French village Moringhem. It was an independent municipality until 1971 when it merged into Wortegem-Petegem.

== History ==
The history of Moregem goes back to the 10th century. It was first mentioned under the name "Moringehim". The writing often changed: Moringem in 1038, Morenghene in 1182, Morenghem in 1330, Mooreghem in 1735, Mooregem around 1800. Finally the name changed to its present name, Moregem.

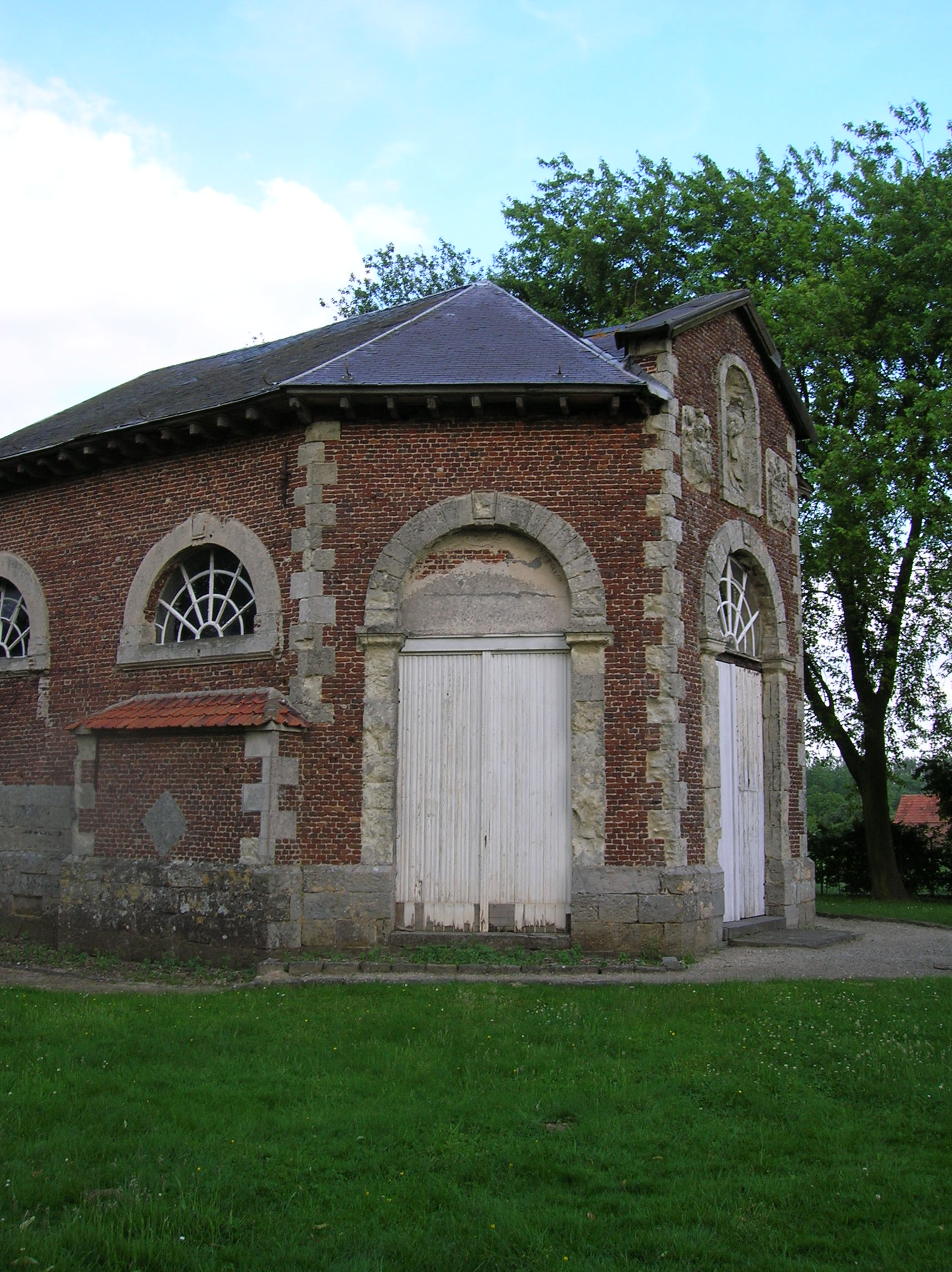
Chapel O.-L. Vrouw Ten Doorn

The Chapel of Our Lady ten Doorn was constructed in 1805 by the baron, because his daughter was cured from an illness. The chapel later became a site of pilgrimage.

Moregem was a heerlijkheid (landed estate) under Oudenaarde. The barons of Moregem used to be mayor of the municipality until 1920. In 1971, the municipality merged into Wortegem-Petegem.
