= Lique Schoot =

Dutch visual artist (born 1969)

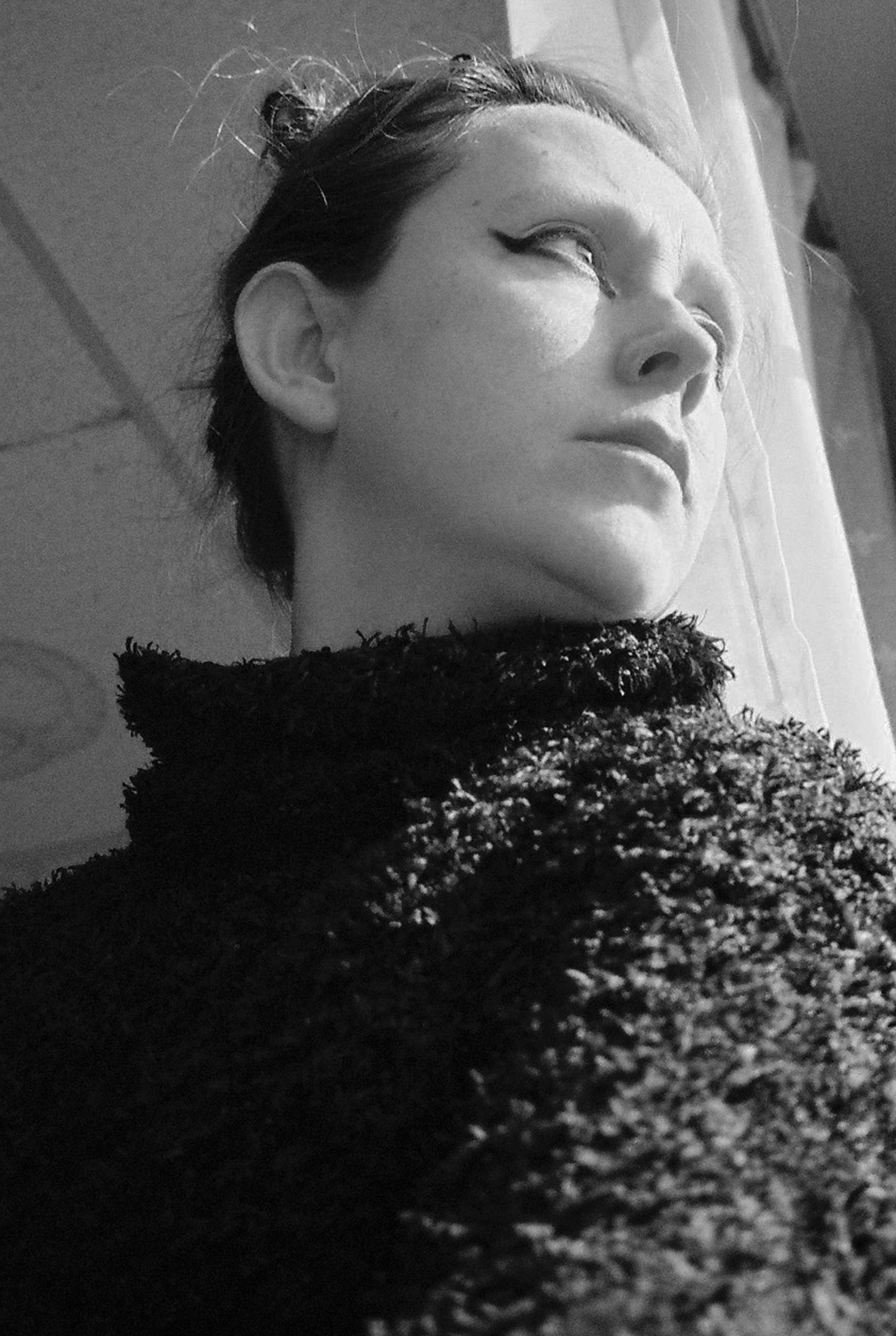
Lique Schoot, Self-portrait

Lique Schoot (born 10 December 1969 in Arnhem) is a Dutch visual artist who is preoccupied with the self-portrait in a multidisciplinary way. She was educated at the Academy of Fine Arts in Arnhem (ArtEZ).

== Awards, grants and nominations ==
- 2001 - Nomination 13th Painting Award Boechout, (BE) (catalogue)
- 2003 - 2008 Federal Grants Foundation for Visual Arts, (NL)
- 2004 - Gaver Award, (BE) (catalogue)
- 2005 - Nomination Marnixring Felix De Boeck Award, (BE)
- 2006 - Nomination Gaver Award, (BE)
- 2008 - Honorable mention 11th International Hoppeland Painting Award Benelux and Nord-Pas de Calais, (BE) (catalogue)
- 2013 - Women's and Gender Studies, (USA)
- 2013 - Finalist RPS International Print Exhibition 156, The Royal Photographic Society, (UK) (catalogue)
- 2014 - New Dutch Photography Talent 2015, (NL) (catalogue)
- 2016 - 2020 Working Grant for Established Artists, Mondriaan Fund (NL)

== Life ==
Lique Schoot was born in Arnhem in 1969, from a Dutch mother and Indonesian father. She grew up in Arnhem and followed the Academy of Fine Arts, where she graduated in 1997.

== Work ==
LS data

Lique Schoot is preoccupied with the Self-portrait since her graduation in 1997. She works in the tradition of the conceptual art. She makes paintings, objects, installations and daily photographs. Her work reflects emotions like pain, love and loneliness and show the major themes of life: birth, growth, decay and death - shown in different series, like Somewhere, Pillow Portraits, Towel Portraits, Sleeping Portraits and Moments in Time. Her oeuvre of the Self-portrait is called 'LS data'.

LS diaries

Since October 2003 she takes a photograph of herself every day, creating a continuous and open-ended record of her existence. The self-portraits are taken at arm's length with a hand-held, film-containing camera. These visual diaries illustrate her feelings as captured in one moment each day. Each month, the film roll is developed in the lab. The prints are stored on a CD, edited on the computer and titled with the date they are made (year, month and day). The project contains more than 5000 photographs.

Paintings

Lique Schoot has been painting self-portraits for more than fifteen years. She selects certain images from her LS diaries to become the basis for her works. Her paintings refine and distill the immediacy of candid photography to create formally dynamic compositions at the same time that they expose self-revelation to be another form of camouflage. They are a balancing act between abstraction and figuration, between rationality and feeling, and between existence and perception.

Both her paintings and her photography explore authenticity and introspection in the tradition of Frida Kahlo and Nan Goldin and at the same time invoke the older Dutch tradition of self-examination in Rembrandt and Van Gogh.

== Selected exhibitions ==
- A.I.R. Gallery, Brooklyn NY, (USA)
- Be-part, (BE)
- CODA Museum, (NL)
- FeliXart Museum, (BE)
- Gorcums Museum, (NL)
- Het Valkhof Museum, (NL)
- Koehnline Museum of Art, (USA)
- Museum van Bommel van Dam, (NL)
- Museum Bronbeek, (NL)
- Museum Kurhaus Kleve, (DE)
- SONS Museum, (BE)
- Phoenix Art Museum, (USA)
- Rencontres d'Arles, (FR)

== Collections ==
Lique Schoot's work is included in several collections, corporate as well as private and in the Netherlands as well as abroad, e.g., Provinces of Gelderland, Delta Lloyd Amsterdam, UMC St. Radboud Nijmegen, OHRA Arnhem, Essent N.V., Municipal Archives of The Hague, Museum Bronbeek (NL), SONS Museum (BE) and Museum van Bommel van Dam (NL).
