= Hof van Cleve =

Restaurant in Kruisem, Belgium

Coordinates: 50°54′13″N 3°30′35″E

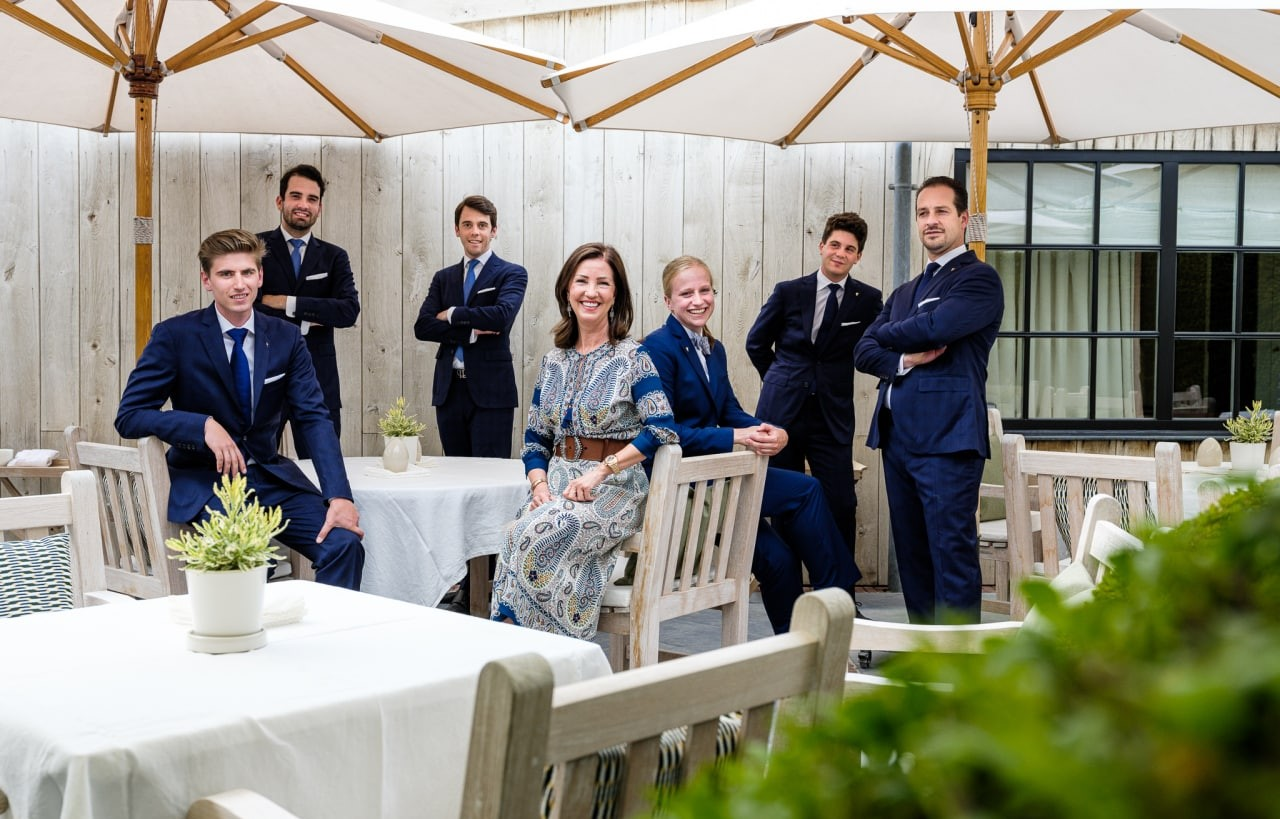
- Company type: Restaurant
- Industry: Restaurant business

Hof van Cleve is a restaurant based in Kruisem, Belgium. The chef is Peter Goossens.

The restaurant has had three stars in the Michelin Guide since 2005.

== History ==
Hof van Cleve was started as a simple restaurant in Flanders in the 80s. The owner sold it to Peter Goossens in 1987 with the agreement about no gastronomic menus for 5 years. The gastronomic restaurant was opened in 1992. The name comes from the family who lived at that place until 1968, the Yard (hof) of the Cleve family. It was awarded the Culinary Award of The Most Delicious Table in the Country 2 years later. It was also awarded for the Best Winelist and Best Champagne List (1994). In 1994, the restaurant received its first Michelin star. In 1998, Hof van Cleve got its second star and in 2005 its third Michelin star. The restaurant has been the only gastronomy place with three Michelin stars in Belgium until 2021. In 2003, Stijn Van der Beken from Hof van Cleve was recognised as the “Best Sommelier of Belgium 2004”.

Since 2004, the restaurant has also received a score of 19.5 on 20 according to GaultMillau. In 2007–2008, the Hof van Cleve menus were served in brasserie-style in the Museum brasserie and Museum café situated in Brussels. In 2012, the restaurant's sommelier Pieter Verheyde was recognised as the “Best Sommelier of Belgium 2012”. In 2016, Mathieu Vanneste from Hof van Cleve was honored with the same award. In 2020, the restaurant was closed due to the COVID-19 pandemic during the first (March — June 2020) and second (October 2020 — June 2021) lockdown. In 2020, the restaurant's sommelier Tom Ieven who started in Hof van Cleve in January 2019 was recognised as the “Best Sommelier of the Year 2021” by Gault&Millau.

== Management ==
Peter Goossens is the chef of Hof van Cleve. He owns the restaurant together with his wife Lieve.

== Awards ==
In 2021, Hof van Cleve was honoured with the Best of Award of Excellence 2021 by Wine Spectator.

In 2020, it was recognised as Belgium's Best Restaurant with World Culinary Awards.

In 2019, it was listed among the Top 20 Best Restaurants in the World in the French magazine Le Chef. Hof van Cleve also was included in the Top 30 Best Restaurants in the World in 2016 and Top 25 Best Restaurants in the World in 2015 by Le Chef. In 2018 it was also listed as the only Belgian restaurant in Top 100 Best Restaurants in the World 2018 (No.36) by French magazine Le Chef.

In 2017, the restaurant received the Prix Cristal 2017 from Club Royal des Gastronomes de Belgique.

Since 2016 Hof van Cleve has taken the first position among the Top 60 “Best Restaurant of the World” with 94\100 points by WBP Stars.

In 2014, it became the Third Best Restaurant in the World by FOUR Magazine.

Since 2012, Hof van Cleve has been the sole Belgian restaurant in the Elite Traveler's Top 100 Restaurants in the World.

It was voted 17th (2010) and 15th (2011) best in the world by Restaurant magazine's top 50 and has three stars in the Michelin Guide.

Since 2006, Hof van Cleve has been recognised as one of the World's 50 Best Restaurants.
