= Habraken =

Habraken is a surname. Notable people with the surname include:

- N. John Habraken (1928–2023), Dutch architect, educator, and theorist
- William Habraken, Dutch shoe collector
