= Peter Goossens =

Belgian chef, Michelin-starred*** for his restaurant Hof van Cleve

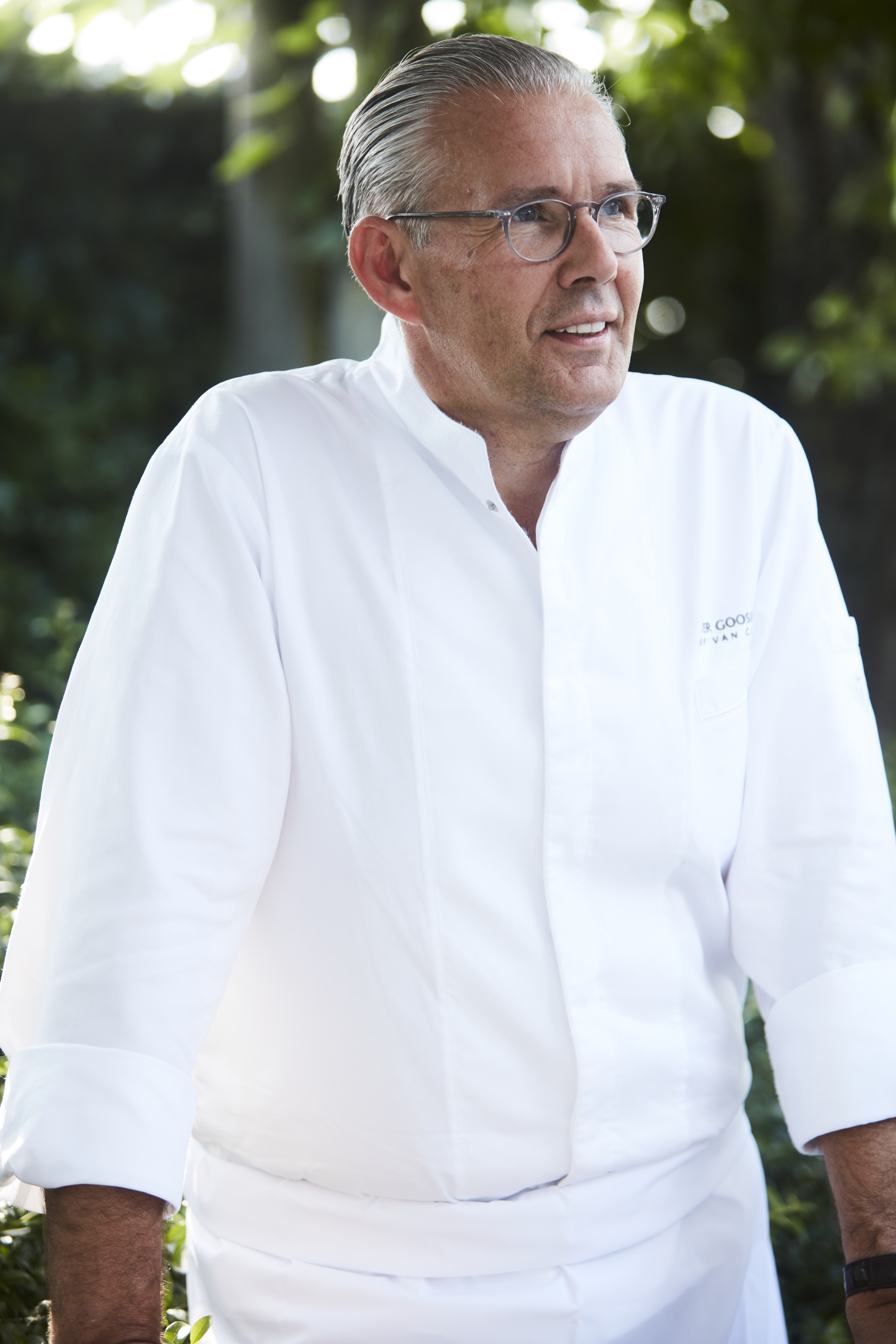
- Born: Zottegem, Flanders, Belgium
- Education: Hotelschool Ter Duinen
- Spouse: Lieve Fermans
- Culinary career
- Current restaurant: Hof van Cleve
- Award(s) won: Grand Prix de l’Art de la Cuisine (2021) Commander of the Order of Leopold (2011)

Peter Goossens (born 1964) is a Belgian chef. He owned and ran the restaurant Hof van Cleve in Kruisem from 1987 to 2023, where he earned three Michelin stars in 2005. He has also presented cooking programmes on Flemish television.

== Early life ==
Goossens was born in Zottegem, Flanders, Belgium in 1964. His parents were engaged in trade. He studied at the culinary school of Ter Duinen (nl. Hotelschool Ter Duinen) in Koksijde. Goossens moved to France and did his first internship in the restaurant Le Pré Catelan in Paris. In 1982–1986, he took training at Lenôtre, Pré Catelan, Pavillon d'Elysée, Blanc in Thoissey and at Byblos in Saint-Tropez.

== Career ==
In 1987, he became the owner of the restaurant in Kruisem and turned it into a gastronomic restaurant Hof van Cleve in 1992. It specialized in Belgian-French cuisine with Asian flavours. In 1994, the restaurant got a Michelin star. The second Michelin star was given in 1998. In 2005, he became the youngest Belgian chef to get three stars in Michelin. Since 2000, he has been a Member of Mastercooks of Belgium. Since 2004, Hof van Cleve has had 19.5\20 on Gault&Millau. In 2006–2008, he was an advisor for the "Museum Brasserie" in Brussels. Also, since 2008 Goossens has been a culinary advisor “Unilever”.

In 2008, he launched his culinary TV-shows on VTM "Mijn Restaurant" and in 2009 "De Beste Hobbykok van Vlaanderen". Later, he started two more TV-programmes "Meesterlijke Klassiekers" in 2010 and "De keuken van de Meester" in 2011. In 2010, he founded the culinary TV-channel Njam! together with Studio 100.

In 2011-2019 he was the President of the Bocuse d’Or Team Belgium. In 2014, Goossens founded the Flanders Food Academy and became the head of the Flanders Food Faculty.

In 2023, Goossens announced his decision to leave Hof van Cleve at the end of the year. In a press release, he explained that Floris Van Der Veken—the current kitchen chef at Hof van Cleve—will take over the restaurant starting from January 1, 2024. Goossens noted that "he had already been thinking of heading in a new professional direction for years."

== Personal life ==
Goossens has a wife Lieve Fermans and three children. The couple operates the restaurant together.

== Books ==
Peter Goossens published the cookbooks “Koken en Wijn” and “België – Wereldkeuken”. Also, he co-authored several books: MNU and MNU 2 with Sergio Herman and Roger van Damme, “Meesterlijke Klassiekers”, “Passie voor Product” with Njam!, “The Seasons” with ‘Het Laatste Nieuws’. Goossens contributed to “Where Chefs Eat – A Guide to Chefs’ Favourite Restaurants”, “Koken-Het Handboek” (Hotel School ‘Ter Duinen’), “M.E.P.”, “De Essentie” (Unilever), “Chefs van België”, “De Alchemie van Liefde en Lusten” (Bo Coolsaet), “Food & Wine”, “Een Belgisch kookboek”, “Truffels – ‘s werelds zwarte goud”, “Sterrenchefs van bij ons” (Caudelier), “Havanna's – grand cru uit Cuba”, “Kaas en Wijn”.

== Interesting facts ==
Goossens favourite dishes are Young pigeon 'Anjou‘ with crispy bacon, potato mousseline and black truffle and Grilled turbot with spinach, lobster béarnaise and bouillabaisse puree.

== Awards ==
- 2021 — The World's 50 Best Restaurants: Ranking 36th
- 2021 — Honorary Ambassador of the Belgian and Flemish culinary inheritance
- 2021 — Grand Prix de l’Art de la Cuisine from the International Academy of Gastronomy
- 2019-2020 — Hof van Cleve ranks 43rd in The World's 50 Best Restaurants
- 2018 — top-ranking (#20) at the award show of The Best Chef in Milan
- 2017 — European Hospitality Foundation Award – HOTREC
- 2011 — Goossens is also a Knight in the Order of Leopold
- 2004 — Chef of the Year– Gault&Millau Benelux
