= Lucien De Brauwere =

Belgian cyclist (1951–2020)

Personal information
- Born: 10 June 1951 Oudenaarde, Belgium
- Died: 17 October 2020 (aged 69) Petegem-aan-de-Schelde, Belgium

Cycling career
- Sport: Cycling

Lucien De Brauwere (10 June 1951 – 17 October 2020) was a Belgian cyclist. He competed in the individual road race at the 1972 Summer Olympics.

De Brauwere died on 17 October 2020 in Petegem-aan-de-Schelde, aged 69.
