= Wortegem-Petegem =

Municipality in the Belgian province of East Flanders

- Municipality
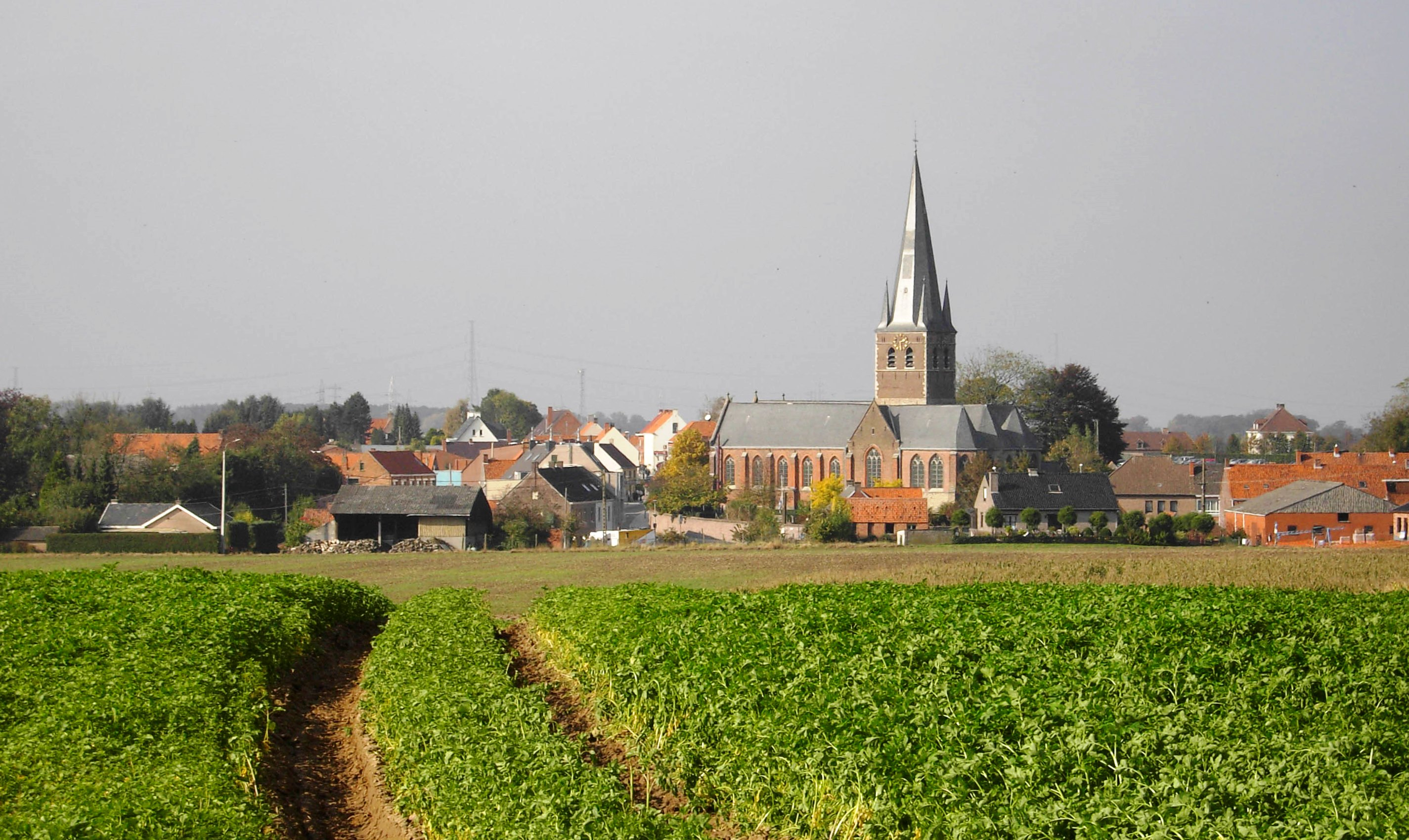

- Flag Coat of arms

- Location of Wortegem-Petegem in East Flanders
- Interactive map of Wortegem-Petegem
- Location in Belgium
- Coordinates: 50°51′N 03°30′E
- Country: Belgium
- Community: Flemish Community
- Region: Flemish Region
- Province: East Flanders
- Arrondissement: Oudenaarde

Government
  - Mayor: Luc Vander Meeren (Open VLD)
  - Governing party: Open VLD

Area
  - Total: 42.47 km^{2} (16.40 sq mi)

Population (2018-01-01)
  - Total: 6,440
  - Density: 152/km^{2} (393/sq mi)
- Postal codes: 9790
- NIS code: 45061
- Area codes: 055
- Website: www.wortegem-petegem.be

Wortegem-Petegem (Dutch pronunciation: [ˌʋɔrtəɣɛm ˈpeːtəɣɛm]) is a municipality located in the Belgian province of East Flanders. In 2021, Wortegem-Petegem had a total population of 6,445. The total area is 41.96 km^{2}.

== Villages ==
Elsegem, Moregem, Ooike, Petegem-aan-de-Schelde and Wortegem.
