= William Habraken =

Dutch shoe collector

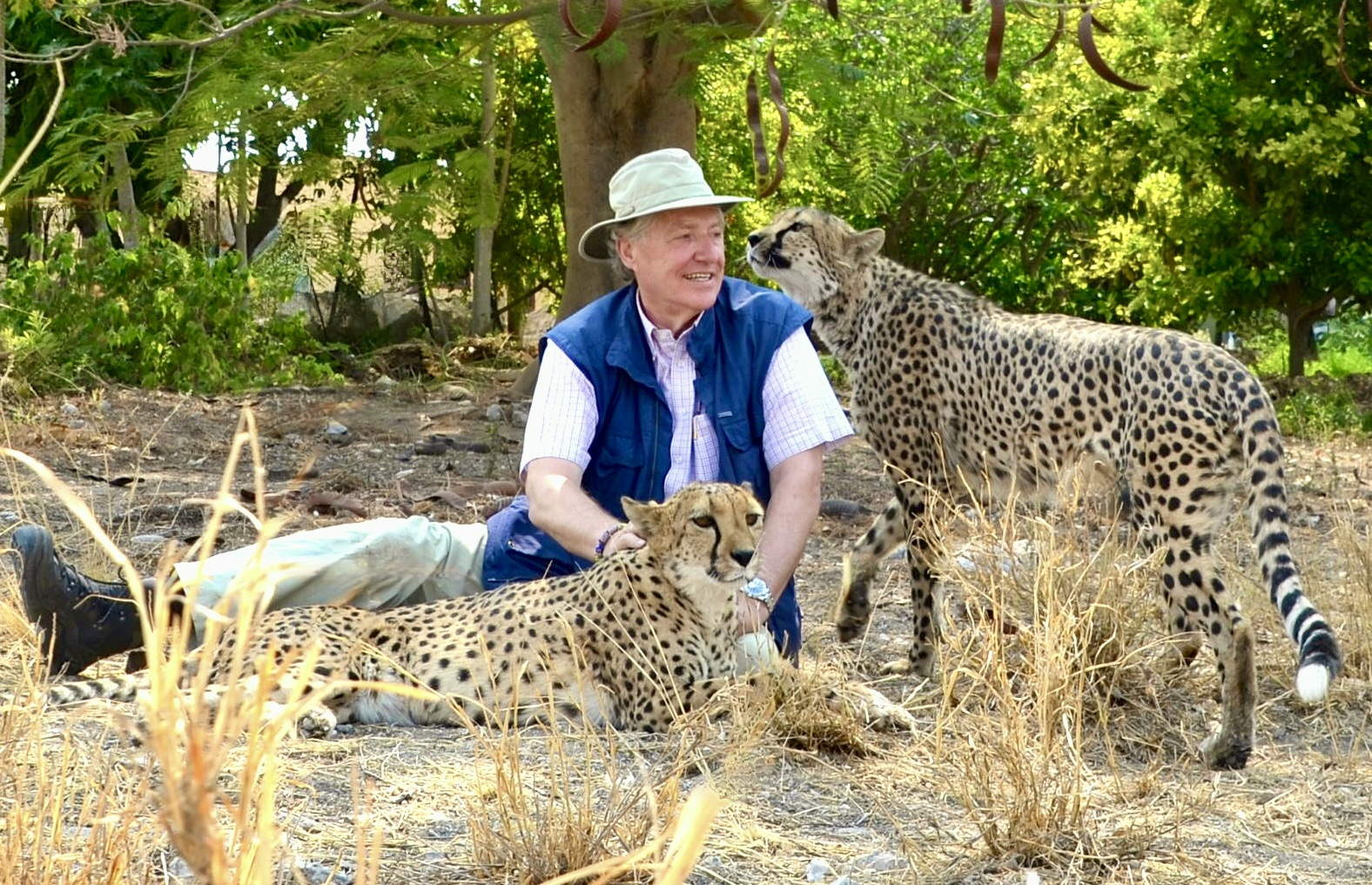
William Habraken

William "Boy" Habraken is a shoe collector who resides in the Netherlands. His collection is housed in the SONS Museum in Kruishoutem, Belgium. In 2006 the Guinness Book of World Records recognized him as having the largest ethnographical shoe collection in the world.

== Biography ==
William Habraken was born at the end of World War II in Eindhoven, Netherlands. At the age of twenty he separated from his father's shoe-business and started his own import/wholesale company in footwear. In 1970 he moved to Taiwan to become one of the first people to export shoes from there and China to Europe. He stood at the base of some of the largest footwear concerns in Europe. Extensive business travel brought him all over the world, visiting over 150 countries. On many of those trips and in his spare time he collected footwear which was part of traditional indigenous clothing. As important as the shoes themselves were to him, was the related information, such as; the materials used, the way of making, the use, the age and the name in the native language.

== Collections ==
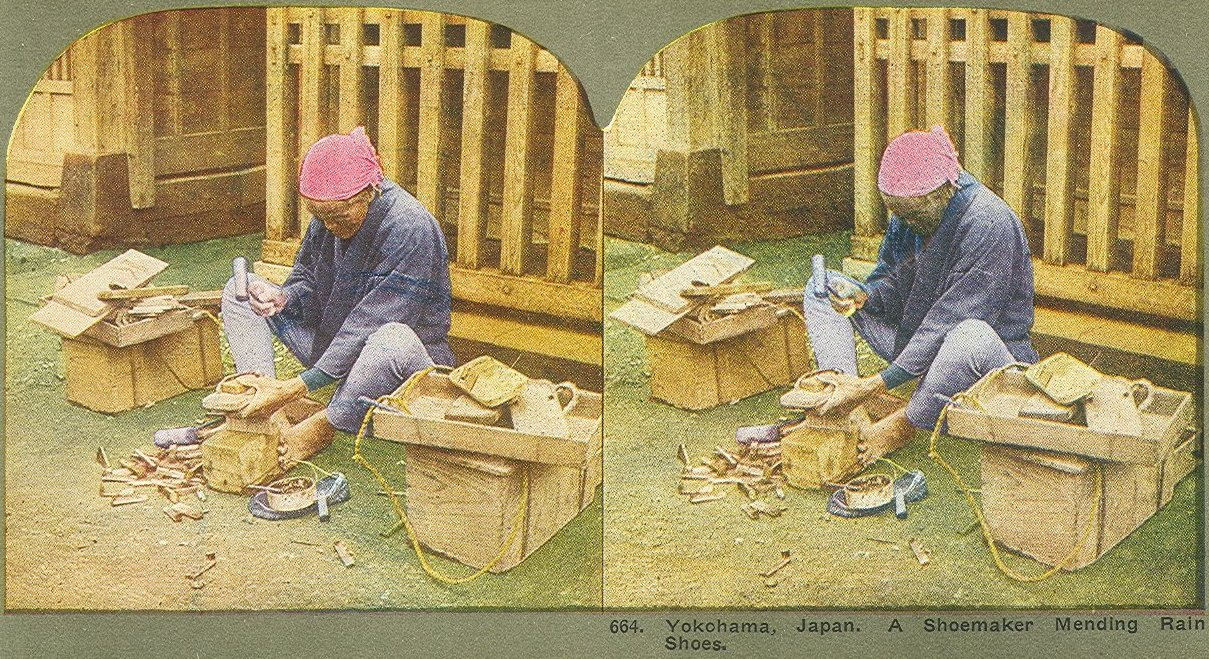
Yokohama shoemaker

=== Ethnographic collection ===
Starting with his first pair in 1968, he acquired a unique collection of over 3400 pairs of shoes out of about 155 countries, states and territories. There are exceptional specimens of North-American Indians, Arctic Inuit, African tribes, Berber, Bedouin, Mongols, the Ottoman - and the pre-Inca empires. Extensive parts of the collection originate in Japan, India, Iran, Tibet and Pakistan. Europe is represented from Iceland to Russia and from Lapland to Spain. The collection has a broad range of footwear. Examples are Kadaichi shoes made of emu feathers and human hair (used by Australian native executioners). Beautiful bride-shoes from Afghanistan, India, Syria and Turkey. As a native of the Netherlands he of course also collected many wooden shoes.

=== Designer collection ===
Next to the ethnographic collection, William Habraken also collected a comprehensive collection of unique pieces of well known shoe designers from around the world. The collection comprises among others rare designs of 20th century designers such as André Perugia and Salvatore Ferragamo, and from contemporary designers such as Christian Louboutin and Manolo Blahnik.

== Works ==
=== Tribal and Ethnic Footwear of the World ===
His ethnographic collection served as a basis for his influential book "Tribal and Ethnic Footwear of The World", which tells stories of footwear around the world. ISBN 90-76295-12-3

=== Did the Gods Wear Shoes? ===
In his quest to unearth every possible detail of his collection and the history of each pair, he pondered the question of who wore the first pair of shoes. This question resulted in his second book with the title "Did the Gods Wear Shoes". ISBN 978-90-818079-2-0

=== They Who Came Before Us ===
In the book "Did the Gods wear shoes" the author explored the possible existence of prior civilizations. In his sequel "They who came before us" he provides the basis for that possibility. The book focuses on prehistoric mason works around the world. The author uses many detailed pictures along with personal observations to establish an alternative to mainstream historical believes. ISBN 978-90-818079-3-7

=== Holy Shit! Religion, fairytales for the gullible ===
Following on his previous books, the author substantiates his argument that belief in the gods of the Abrahamic religions can be placed in the same category as belief in Saint Nicholas, Santa Claus, the Easter Bunny, the Tooth Fairy and other fairy tales. ISBN 978-90-818079-4-4

=== Anaa Sázi – Ancient aliens ===
At the request of those present at the author's lectures, this printed magazine is a representation thereof. During his lectures in his homeland and abroad he elaborates the highlights of his books with the help of 138 projection images. ISBN 9 789081 807968

=== Kemet - The laboratory where man was created ===
The author delivers his magnum opus with this last part of the trilogy. With the two previous parts "Did the Gods Wear Shoes?" and "They Who Came Before Us" he already explored the possibility that before the current civilization there must have been a civilization on earth that had extremely high-tech techniques that are not yet feasible in modern times. This time he goes even further and concludes that the scientific explanation of the origin of man can be equated with the explanation given to children, where the stork delivers them to parents. ISBN 9 789081 807975

=== Aratta - Lost High-Tech in Prehistoric India (The Second Cradle of Humanity) ===
In this book, he sheds light on the unknown and dark prehistoric past of the Indian subcontinent. Using hundreds of hand-made photographs of prehistoric high-tech objects that in modern times could not possibly have been created, or only with the aid of high-tech equipment, and for which the academic world cannot provide any satisfactory explanation, he demonstrates, with almost certainty, that the development of the history of ancient India could well have been completely different from what is generally scientifically assumed. ISBN 9 789081 807982

=== Baalbek – A Prehistoric Spaceport? ===
In 1927, on the Paracas Peninsula in Peru, skeletons were discovered with remarkably large, heavy, and elongated skulls. DNA analysis conducted in 2017 revealed that these skulls belonged to beings who originated from the Middle East. How did these beings travel from the Middle East to the west coast of Peru in prehistoric times? The author concluded that they may have utilized aircraft. To substantiate this finding, he searched both continents for potential prehistoric takeoff and landing sites for such craft—and discovered them in many locations. Baalbek, in present-day Lebanon, proved to be the most significant of these. ISBN 9 789081 807999

== Public ==
=== Lectures ===
He holds lectures on a regular basis, a notable example occurred on March 14, 2016 when he was invited to give a lecture in The British Museum in London titled: "A long journey: my footwear collection from the Islamic world"

=== Exposition ===
In January 2017 he was invited to design the layout for an exhibition titled "Human Migration" in the peristilium of the Federal Government building in Brussels Belgium. He used shoes of his collection as a symbol to illustrate the road migrants followed in past and presence. This unique exhibition was honored by a visit of Jean-Claude Junker, President of the European Commission.

=== "The Golden Cow" ===
On December 12, 2013 the Schoenen en Lederwaren Sociëteit de Langstraat (SeLL) (Shoe and Leather Society Langstraat) announced that Mr. Habraken was the winner of The Golden Cow. Jury chairman Ellis French said "The jury admired the innovative and dynamic entrepreneurship of Mr. Habraken. As one of the first people he successfully pioneered shoes in the Far East. His vision has adapted to the ever-changing landscape of the industry. Along with that there is the passion with which he collects ethnic footwear from around the world, the associated stories recorded in books and the more than 2000 pairs he exhibits in a private museum, are all reasons why he deserves The Golden Cow! "
