= Zingem =

- Village and former municipality
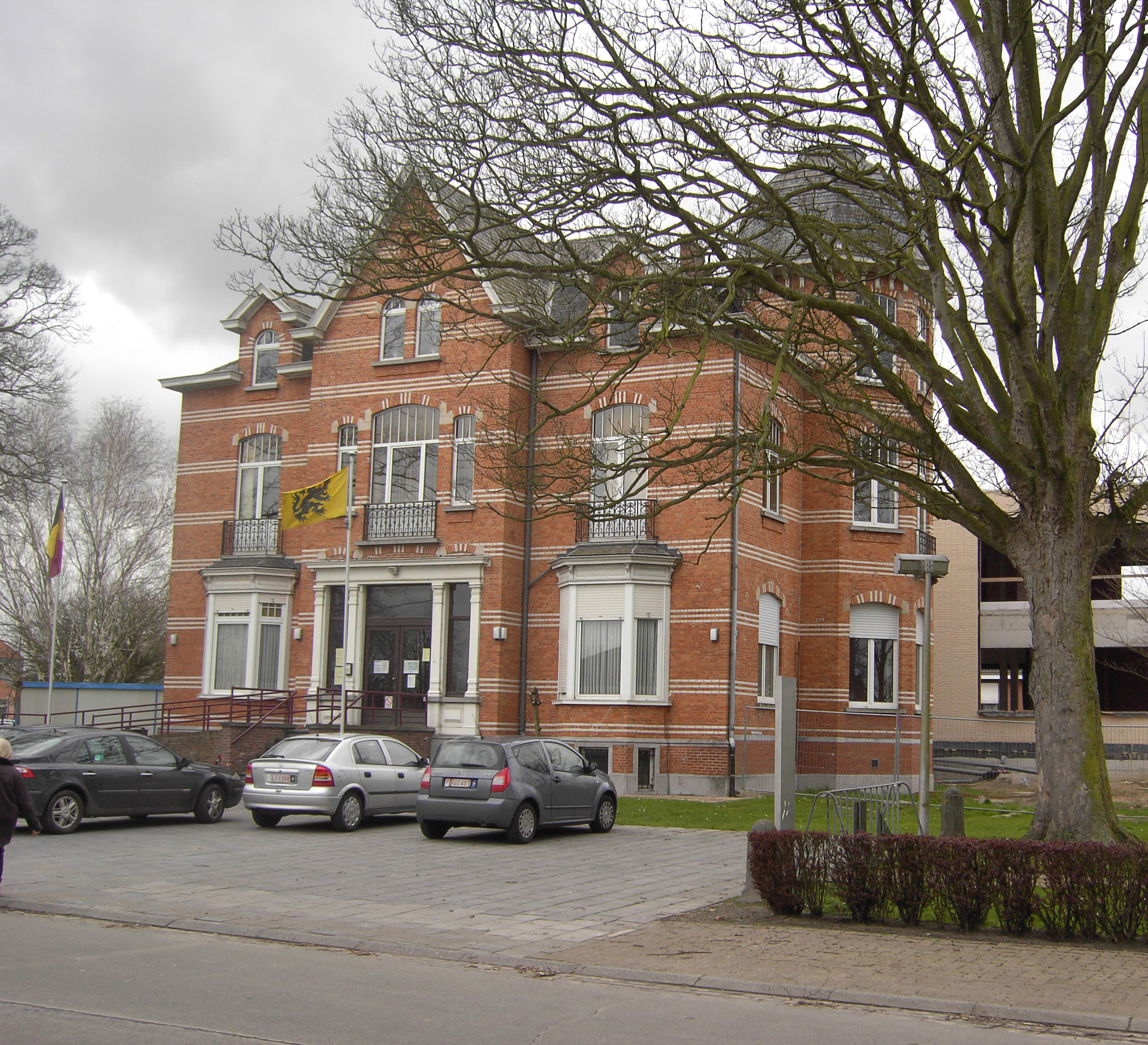
- Zingem town hall

- Flag Seal

- Location in Belgium
- Coordinates: 50°54′N 03°31′E
- Country: Belgium
- Region: Flemish Region
- Province: East Flanders
- Arrondissement: Oudenaarde
- Municipality: Kruisem

Area
  - Total: 8.17 km^{2} (3.15 sq mi)

Population (2021)
  - Total: 4,192
  - Density: 513/km^{2} (1,330/sq mi)
- Time zone: CET
- Postal code: 9750
- Dialing code: 09
- Website: www.zingem.be

Zingem (Dutch pronunciation: [ˈzɪŋɛm]) is a village and former municipality located in the Belgian province of East Flanders. The municipality comprised the towns of Huise, Ouwegem and Zingem proper. In 2018, the municipality of Zingem had a total population of 7,552. The total area is 23.93 km^{2}.

Effective 1 January 2019, Kruishoutem and Zingem merged into the new municipality of Kruisem.

Home to the Meuleken 't Dal - This is one of the smallest windmills in East Flanders and once owned by the Ghent Sint-Pietersabdij. The province made the mill turn and grind again.

== Gallery ==
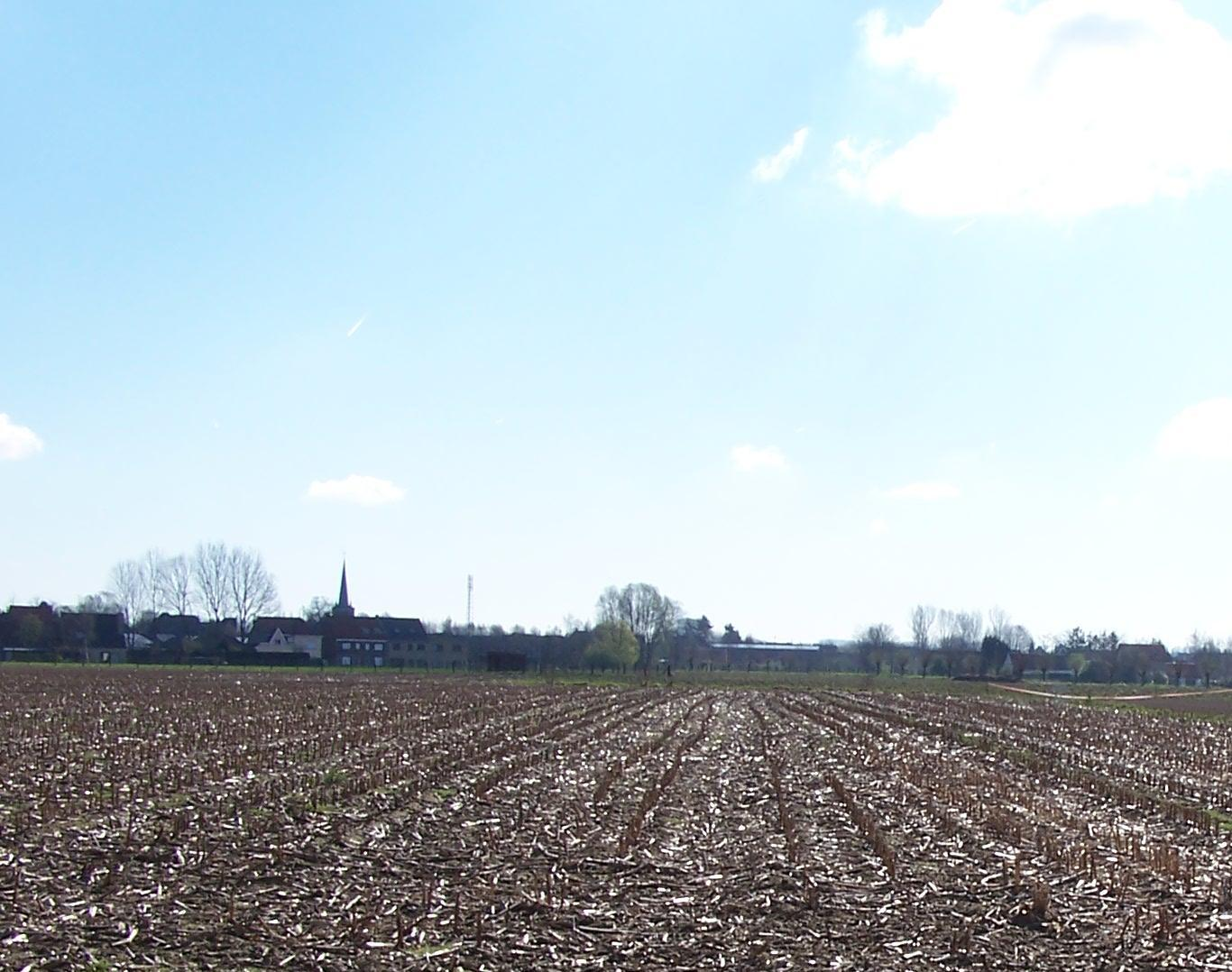
The town of Zingem from the west

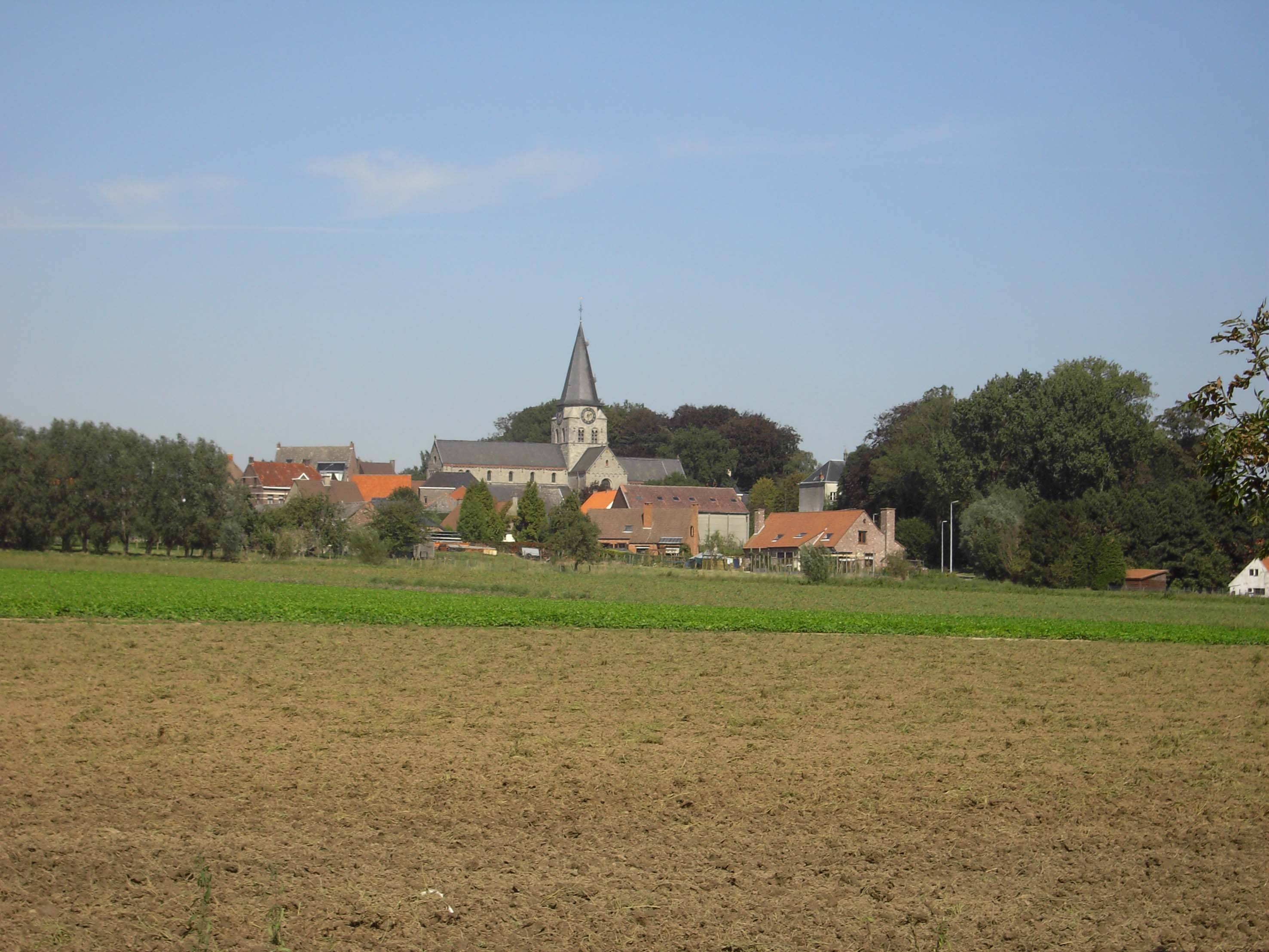
View on Huise

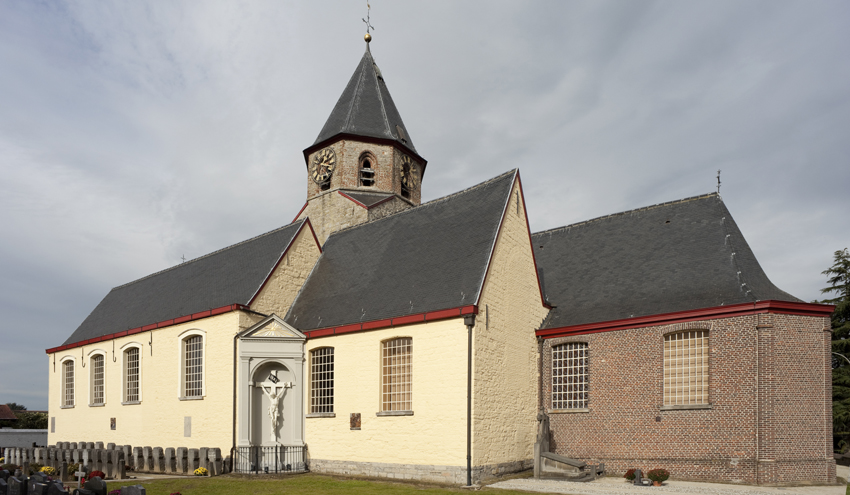
Sint-Jan Baptist church in Ouwegem
