= Ouwegem =

- Village
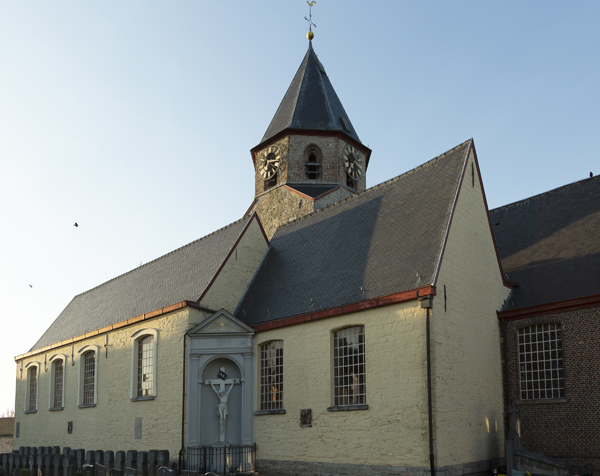
- St John the Baptist Church

- Location in Belgium
- Coordinates: 50.9119°N 3.5969°E
- Country: Belgium
- Province: East Flanders
- Municipality: Kruisem

Area
  - Total: 6.17 km^{2} (2.38 sq mi)

Population (2021)
  - Total: 1,619
  - Density: 262/km^{2} (680/sq mi)
- Time zone: CET

Ouwegem is a village and deelgemeente (sub-municipality) in the municipality of Kruisem in the province of East Flanders in Belgium. The village is located on the edge of the Flemish Ardennes and about 17 kilometres (11 mi) south-west of Ghent.

== History ==
The village was first mentioned in 830 as "villa Aldinga-heim", and means "settlement of the people of Aldo (person)", but artefacts and coins have been recovered in the area from the Roman era. Ouwegem became a village heerlijkheid (landed estate), however there were other smaller heerlijkheden in the area. The 16th century was characterised by war and disease. 258 families were recorded in 1567, but only 73 remained in 1600. In 1628, the heerlijkheid of Ouwegem was elevated to barony. In the 18th century, Ouwegem became a linen manufacturer, and changed to lace in the 19th century. From 1960s, the village started to become a commuter's settlement.

Ouwegem was an independent municipality until 1977 when it was merged into Zingem. In 2019, it was merged into the municipality of Kruisem, but remains a deelgemeente (sub-municipality).

== Buildings ==
The St John the Baptist Church is a three aisled hall church which was first mentioned in 1123 as a property of the Saint Peter's Abbey in Ghent. The lower part of the tower and walls contain 12th century elements. The church was enlarged in 1661 and 1847.

== Gallery ==
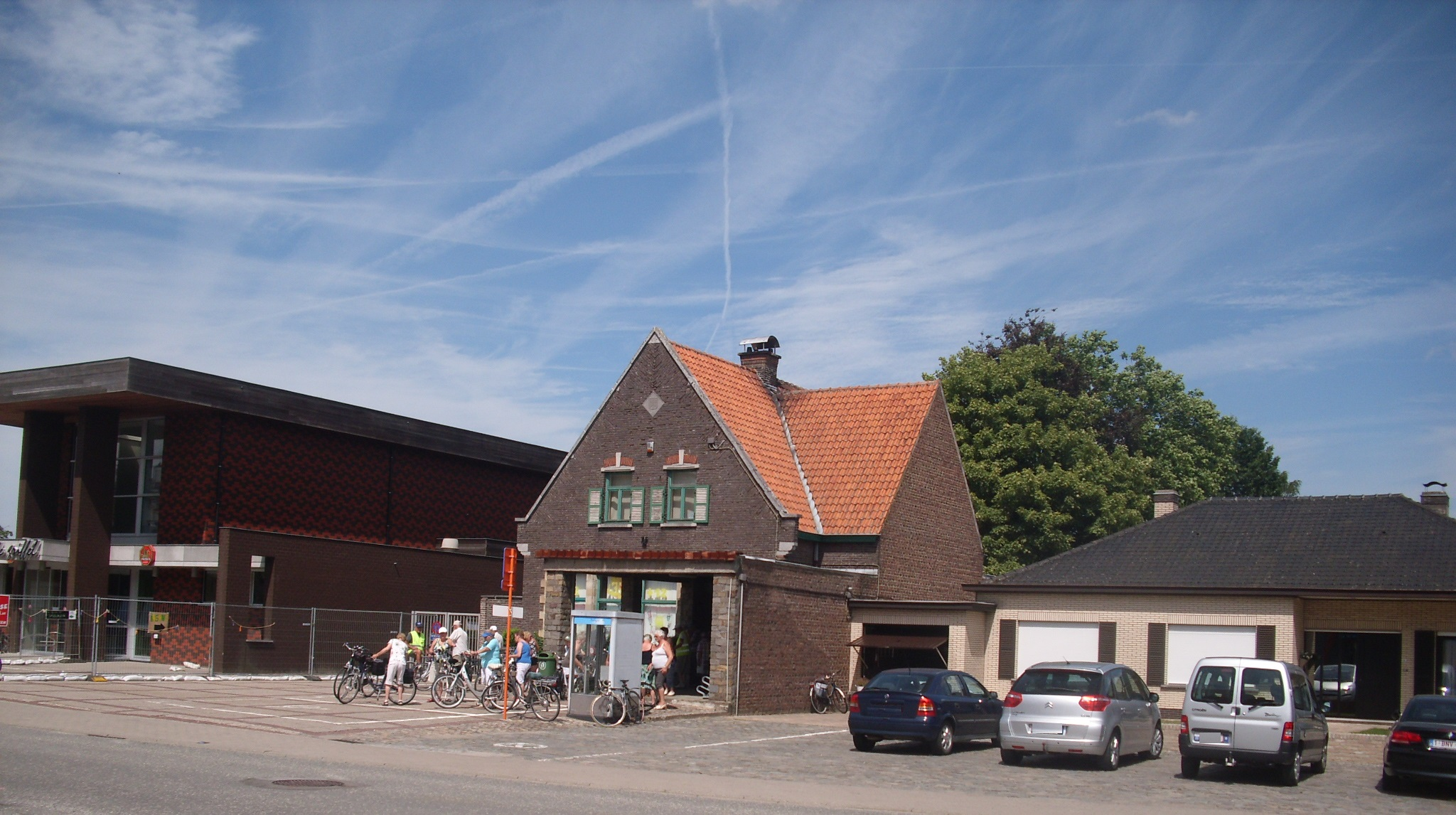
Former town hall

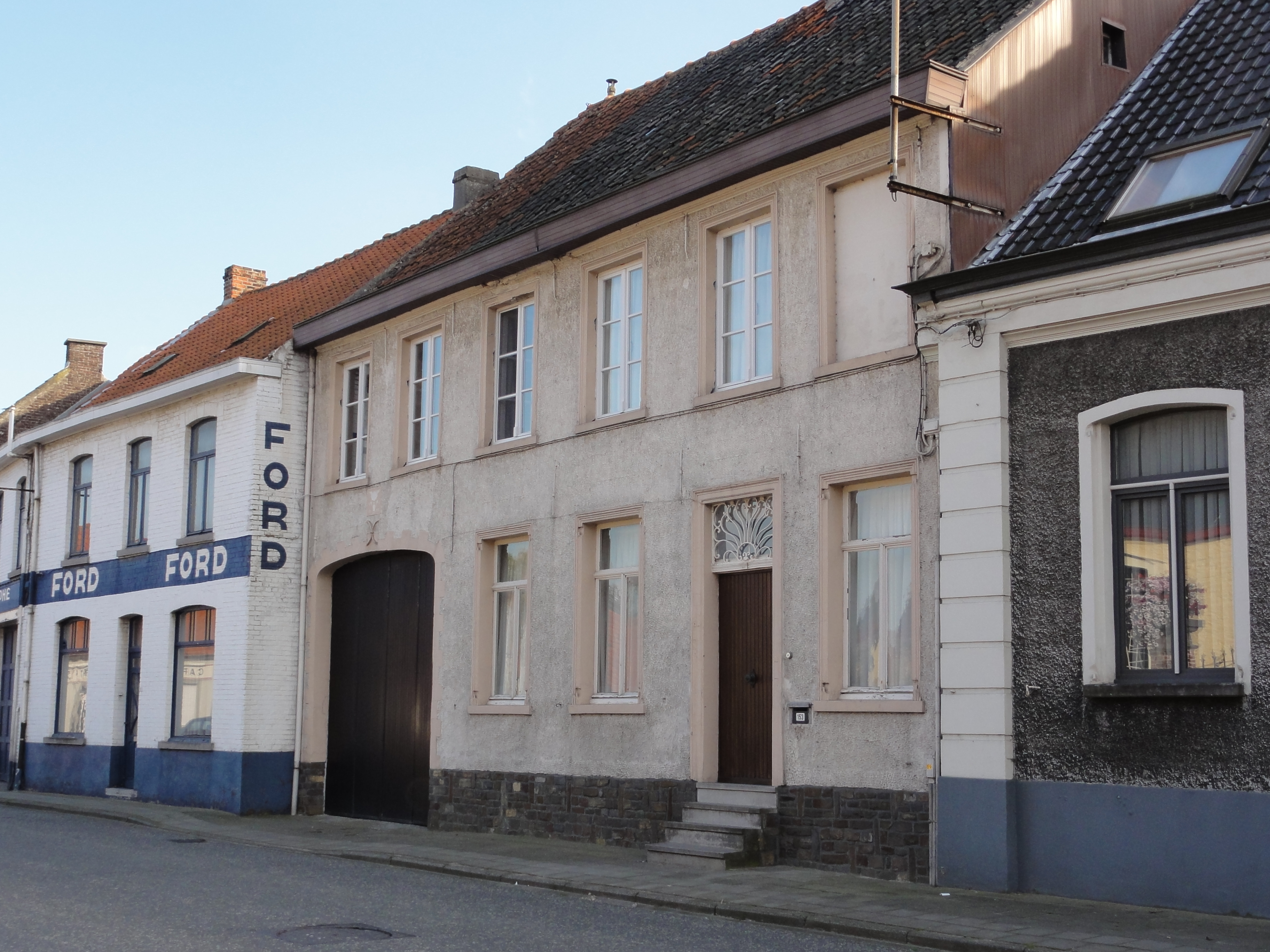
Houses in Ouwegem

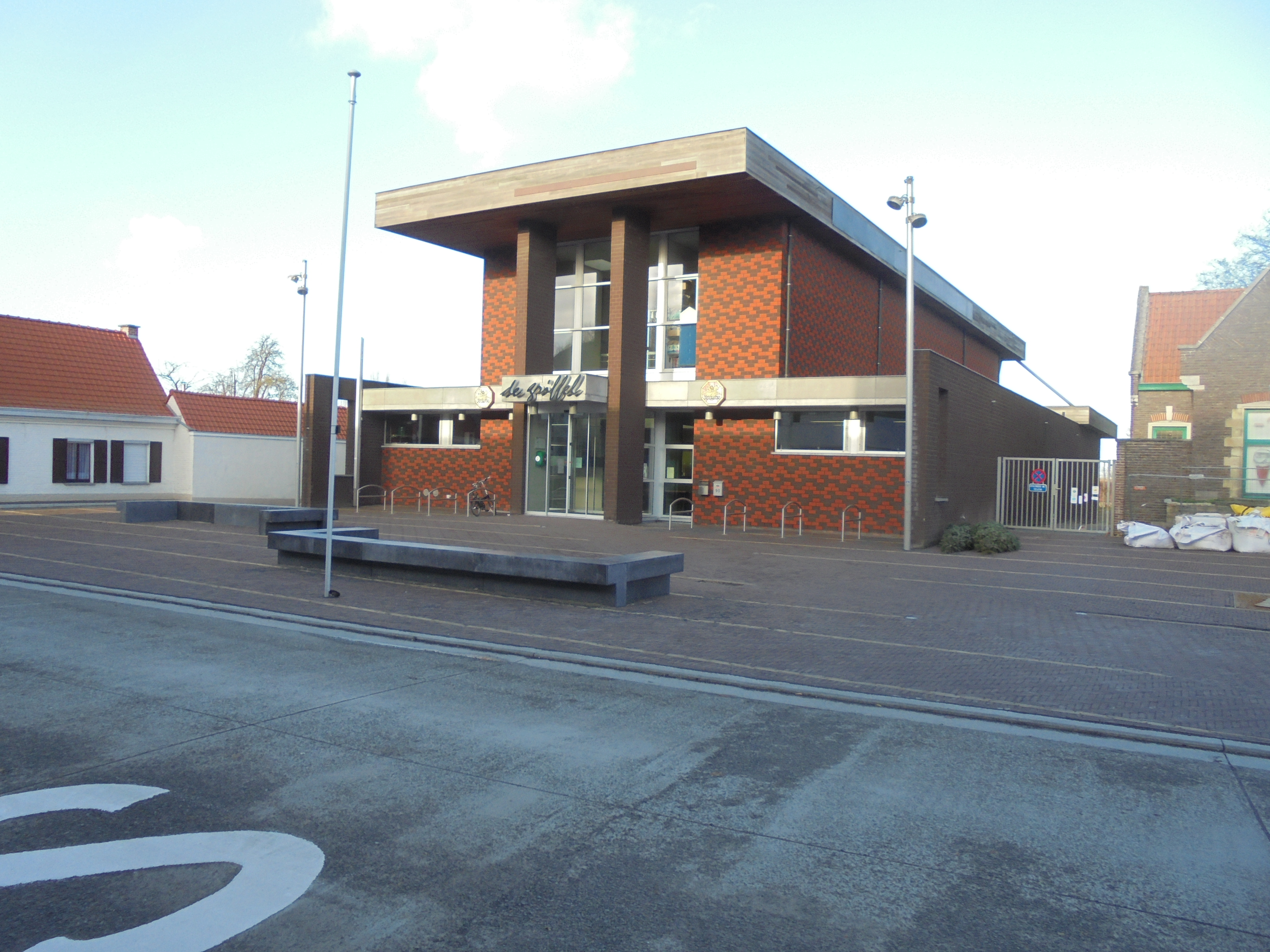
Community centre

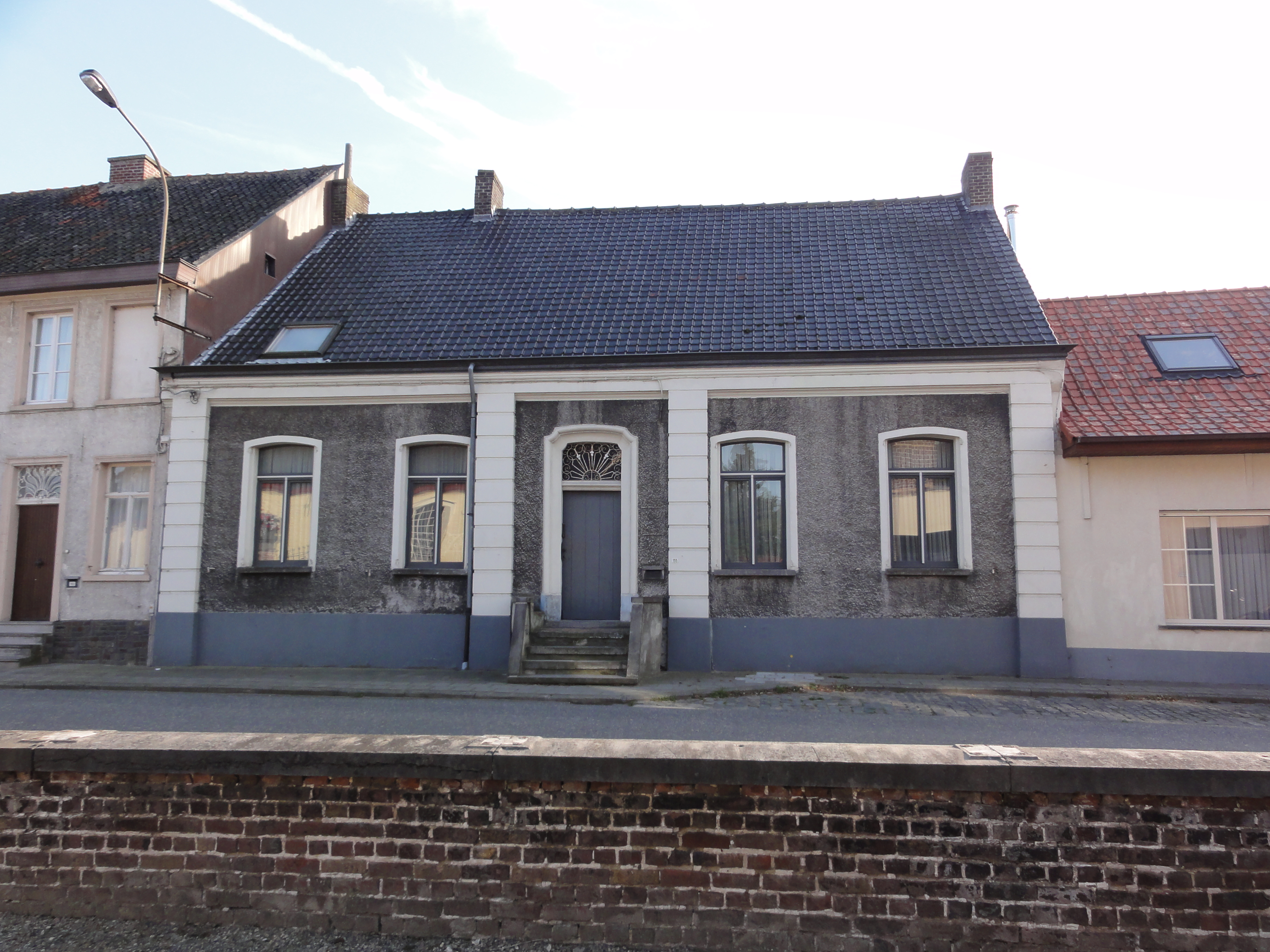
House in Ouwegem
