= Kruishoutem =

- Village and former municipality
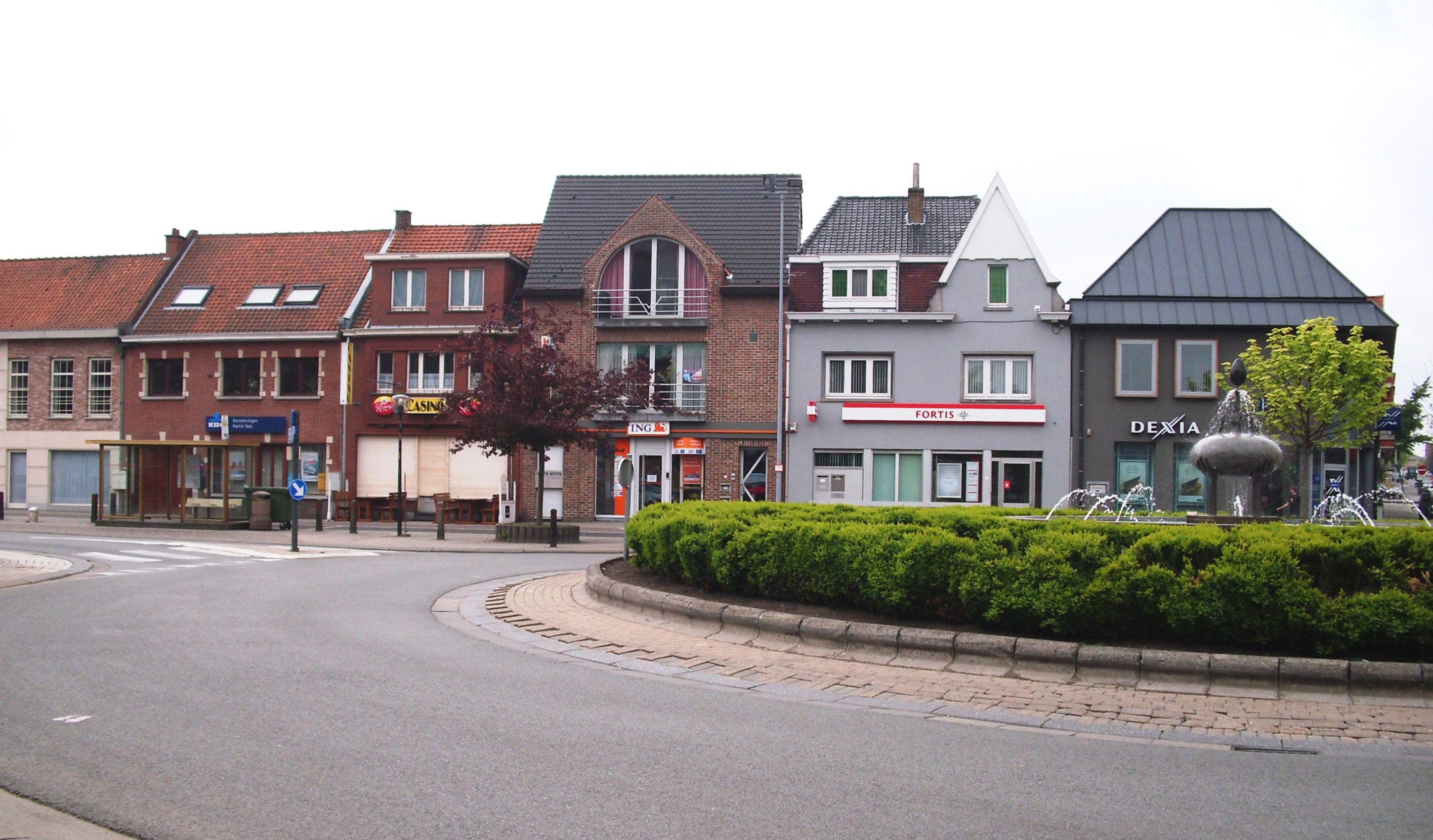
- Street view

- Flag Seal

- Location in Belgium
- Coordinates: 50°54′N 03°31′E
- Country: Belgium
- Region: Flemish Region
- Province: East Flanders
- Arrondissement: Oudenaarde
- Municipality: Kruisem

Area
  - Total: 27.24 km^{2} (10.52 sq mi)

Population (2021)
  - Total: 5,394
  - Density: 198.0/km^{2} (512.9/sq mi)
- Time zone: CET
- Postal code: 9770-9772
- Dialing code: 09
- Website: www.kruishoutem.be

Kruishoutem (Dutch: [krœysˈɦʌutəm]; French: Cruyshautem, also used in English) is a village and was a municipality located in the Belgian province of East Flanders. The municipality comprised the towns of Kruishoutem proper, Nokere and Wannegem-Lede. In January 2018, the municipality of Kruishoutem had a total population of 8,086. The total area is 46.76 km^{2}. On 1 January 2019, Kruishoutem and Zingem merged into the new municipality of Kruisem.

The SONS Museum is located in Kruisem.

== Notable people ==
- Charles Louis Spilthoorn (Spilthooren), born 12 October 1804 in Kruishoutem; died 12 September 1872 in Brussels, lawyer and politician.
- Henry Gabriëls, born in Wannegem-Lede on 6 October 1838, professor & rector in Saint Joseph's Seminary in Troy, New York; bishop of Ogdensburg, New York, until his death in 1921. Created Sanatorium Gabriels and town Gabriels, New York.
- Adolf Daens, priest in Kruishoutem in 1878–1879, later member of the Parliament.

== Gallery ==
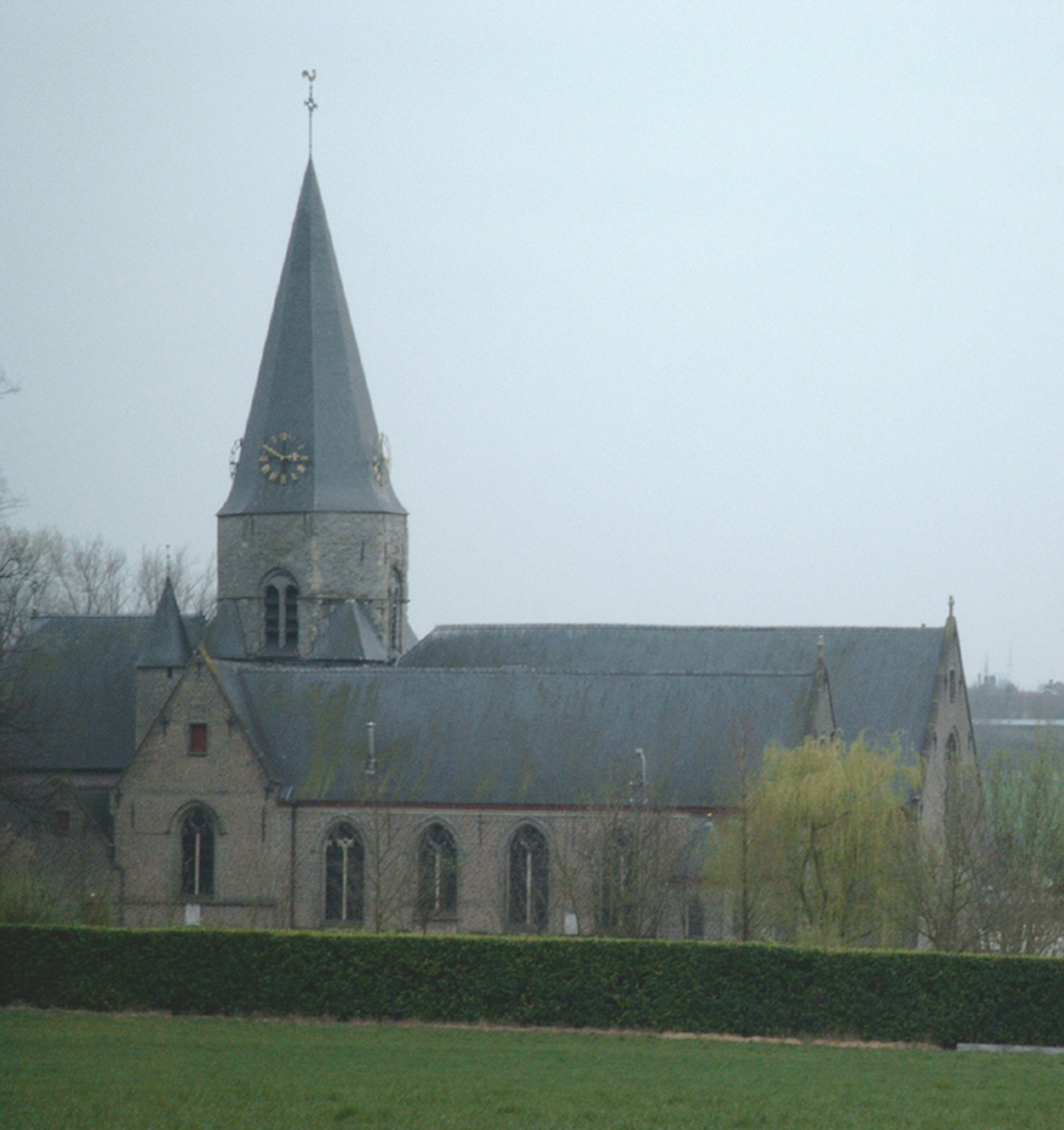
Church of Nokere

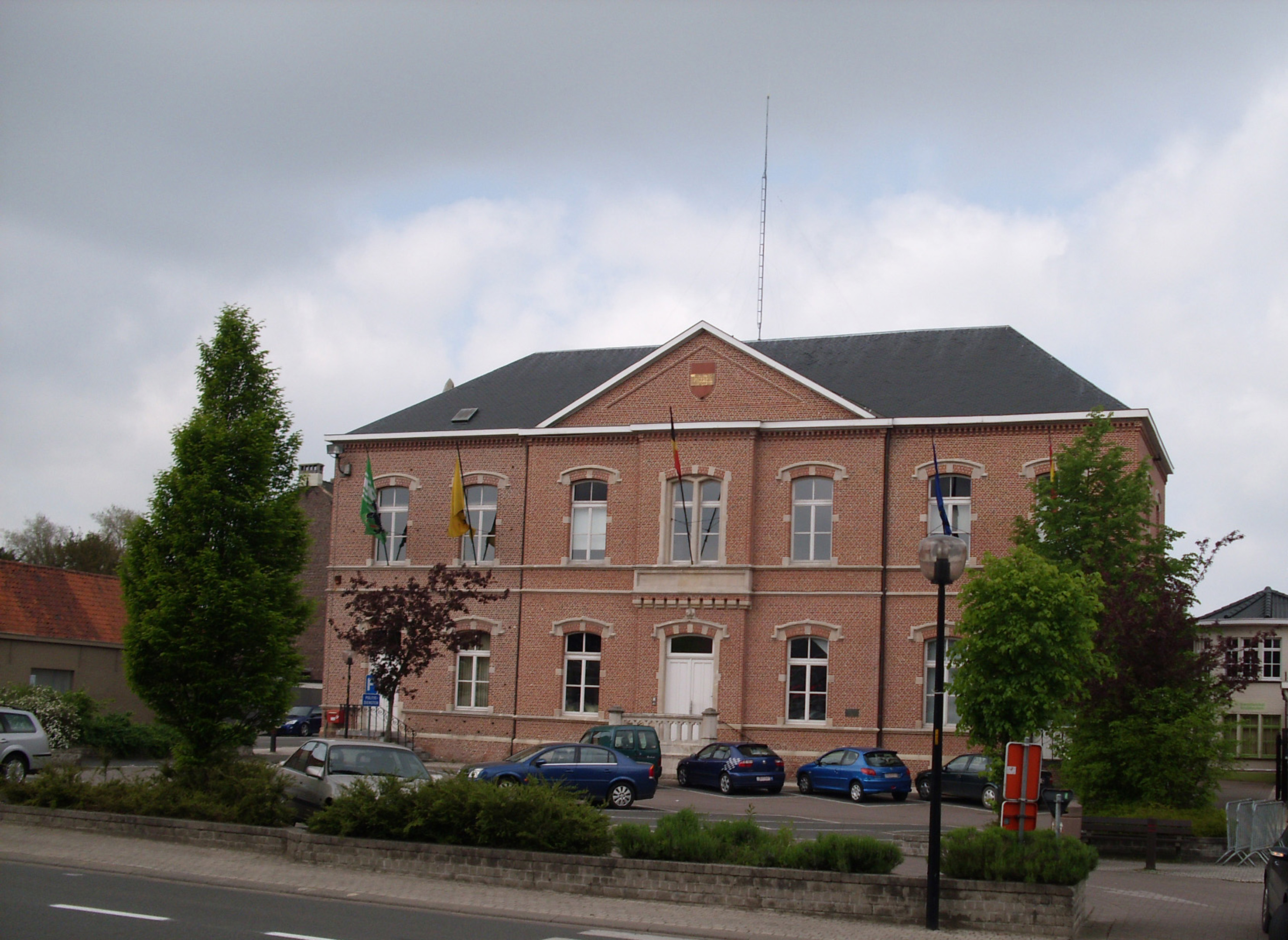
Town hall

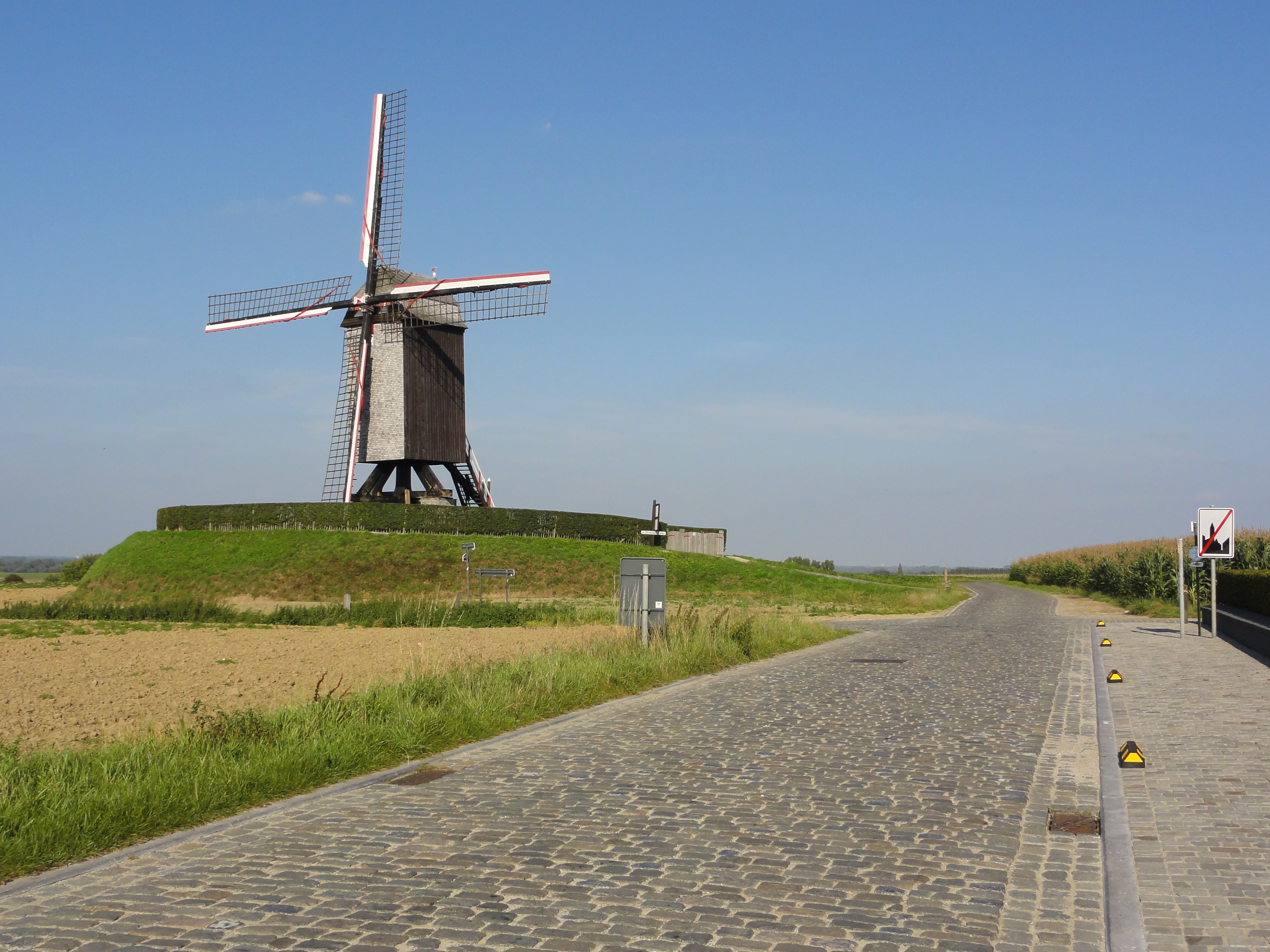
Windmill Schietsjampettermolen

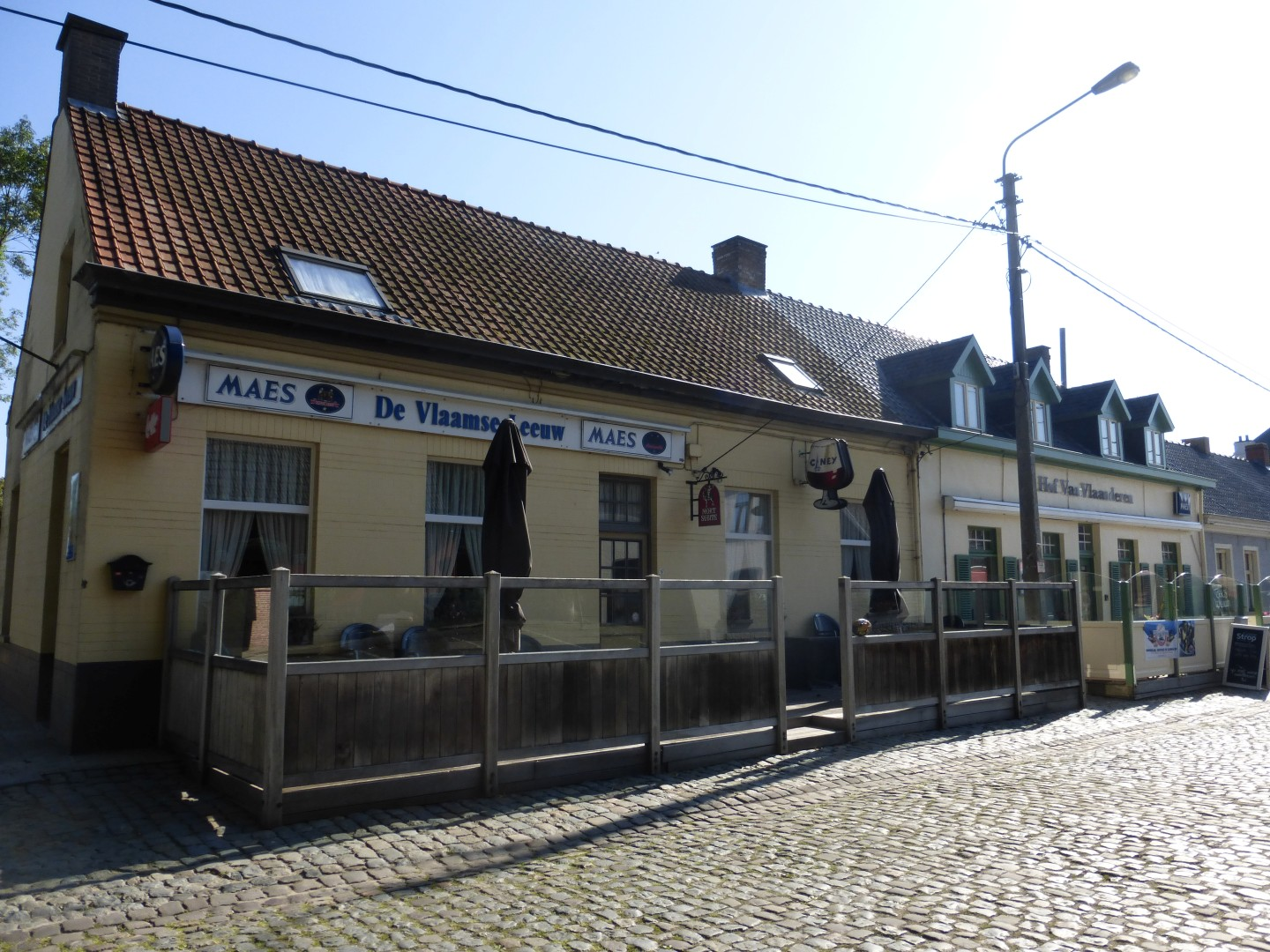
Pub in Kruishoutem
