= Petegem-aan-de-Schelde =

- Village
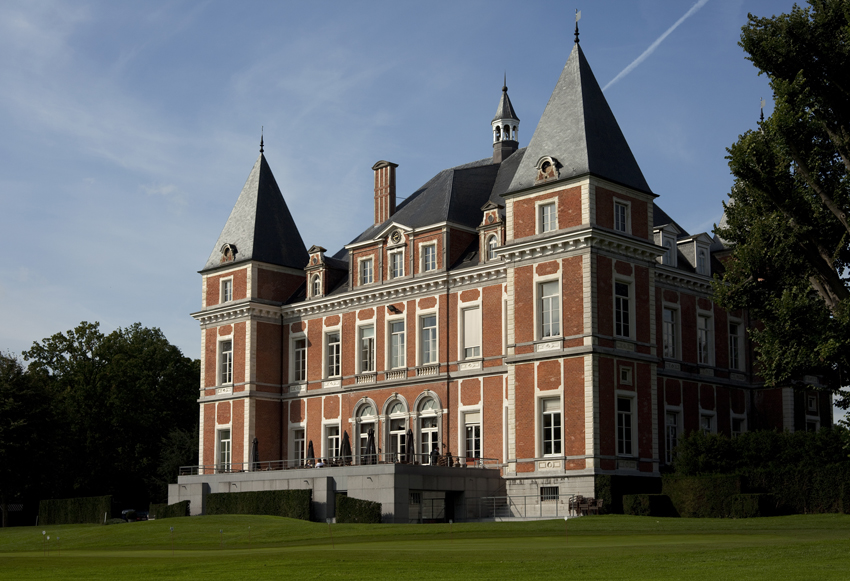
- The New Castle

- Location in Belgium
- Coordinates: 50.83290°N 3.55682°E
- Country: Belgium
- Region: Flemish Region
- Province: East Flanders
- Arrondissement: Oudenaarde
- Municipality: Wortegem-Petegem

Area
  - Total: 11.75 km^{2} (4.54 sq mi)

Population (2021)
  - Total: 2,118
  - Density: 180.3/km^{2} (466.9/sq mi)
- Time zone: CET

Petegem-aan-de-Schelde is a village and former municipality in the Wortegem-Petegem municipality in the Belgian province of East Flanders. The village officially changed its name from Petegem into Petegem-aan-de-Schelde in order to distinguish itself from Petegem-aan-de-Leie. In 1971, the municipality merged into Wortegem-Petegem.

== History ==
The village was first mentioned as Wrattingem in 964. During the Early Middle Ages, a castle which became later known Old Castle of Petegem, was located in Petegem on the left bank of the River Scheldt. Most of the castle was destroyed during warfare, and by the 17th century only a ruin remained.

In the early 1270s, the Abbey of Beaulieu was constructed as a women's abbey for the Poor Clares. In 1276–77, a hospital was established at the location. The abbey was declared bankrupt in 1783, and was later torn down. Parts of the abbey have been reconstructed in the 1980s and 1990s.

In 1847, Baron August Pycke de Peteghem commissioned the construction of the New Castle of Petegem near the location of the old castle. The castle and lands are nowadays owned by the Golf- and Countryclub Oudenaarde.

Petegem-aan-de-Schelde suffered major damage during World War I, and was nearly completely destroyed during World War II. Most of the village has been rebuilt since the late 1940s. In 1971, the municipality merged into Wortegem-Petegem.

== Gallery ==
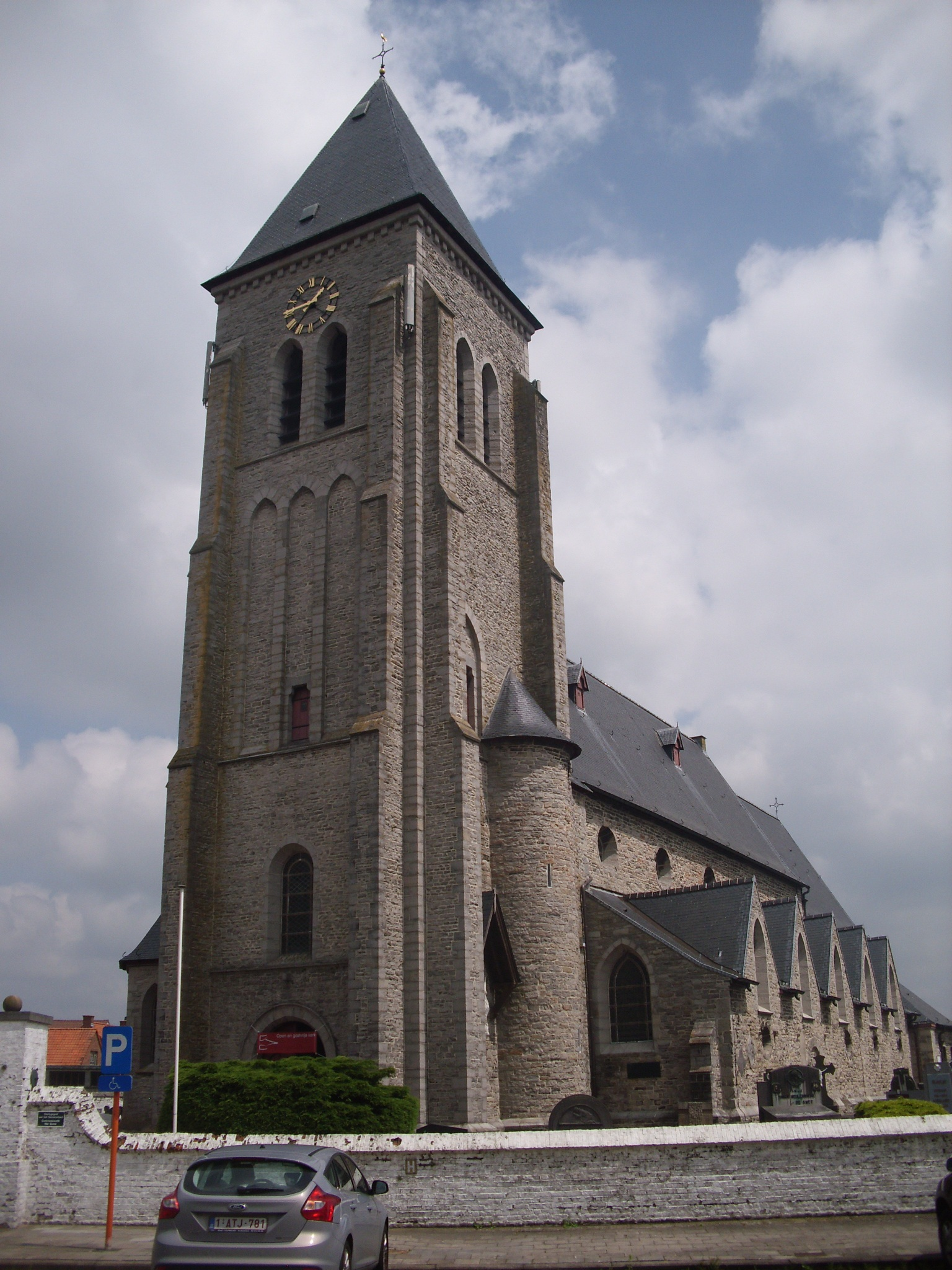
St Martinus Church

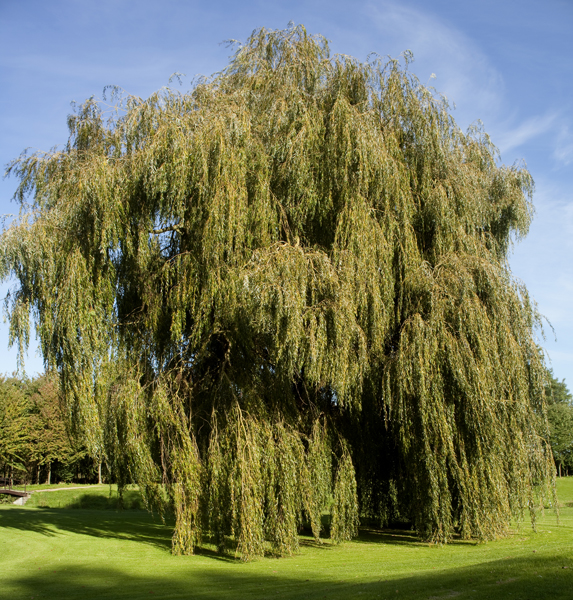
Tree in Petegem-aan-de-Schelde

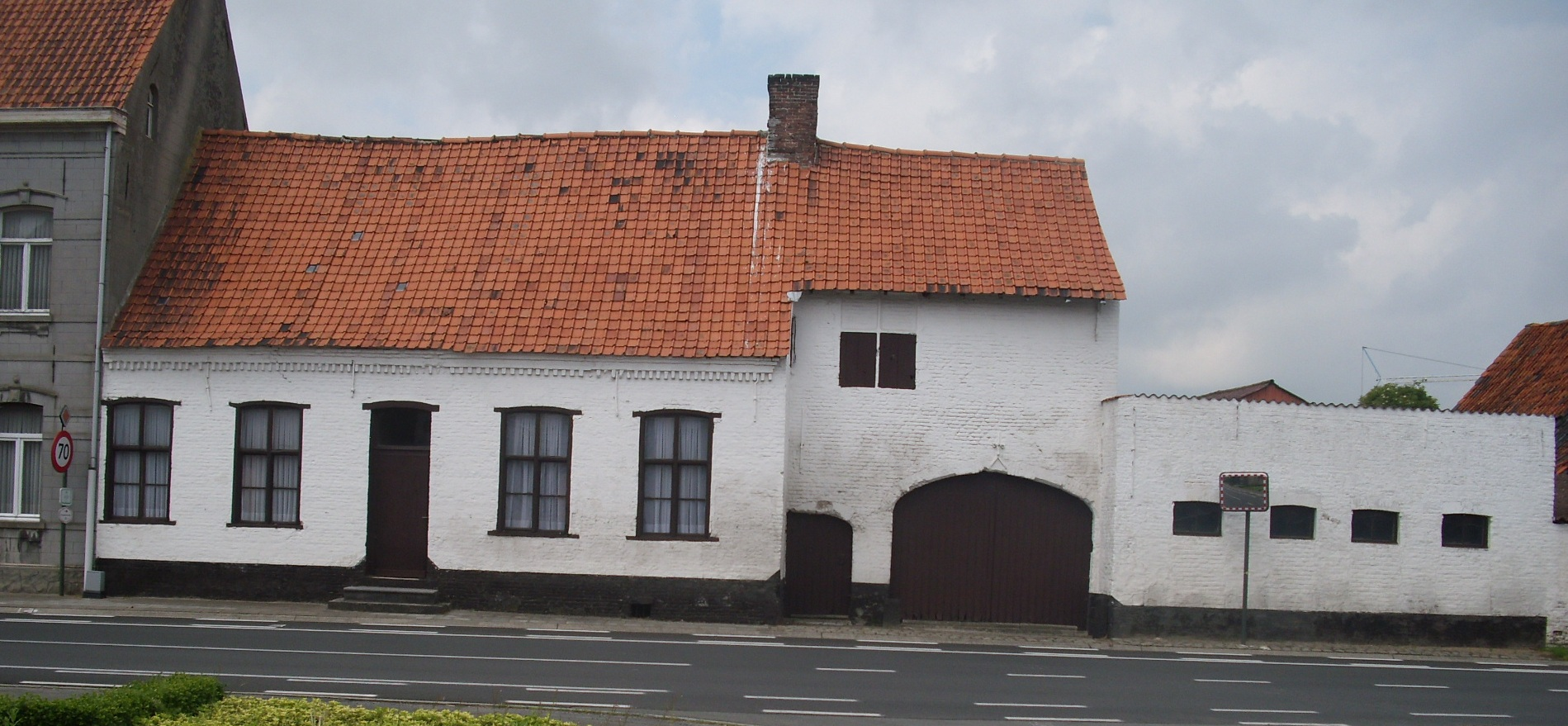
House in Petegem-aan-de-Schelde

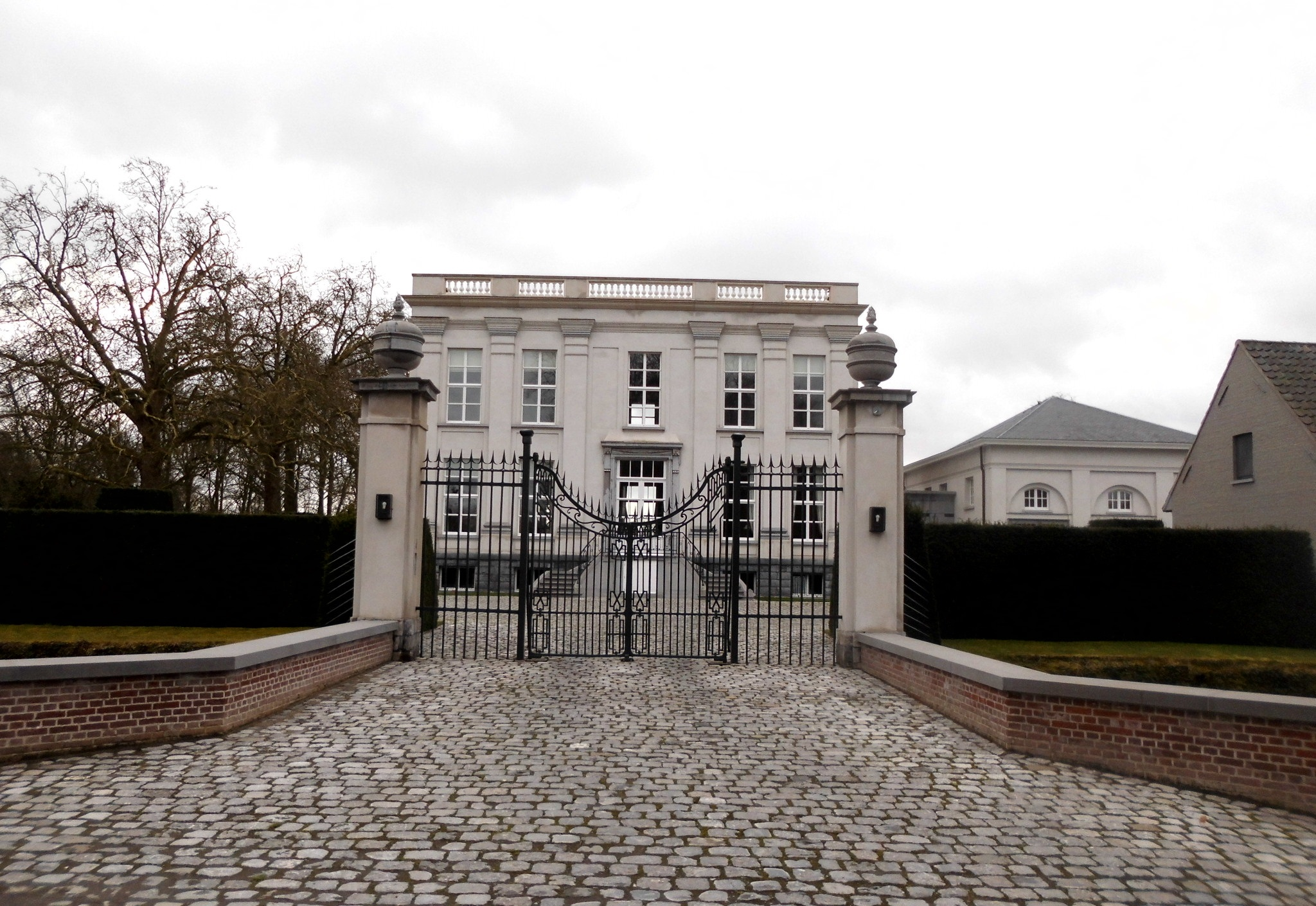
Old Castle
