= Kruisem =

Municipality in the Belgian province of East Flanders

- Municipality
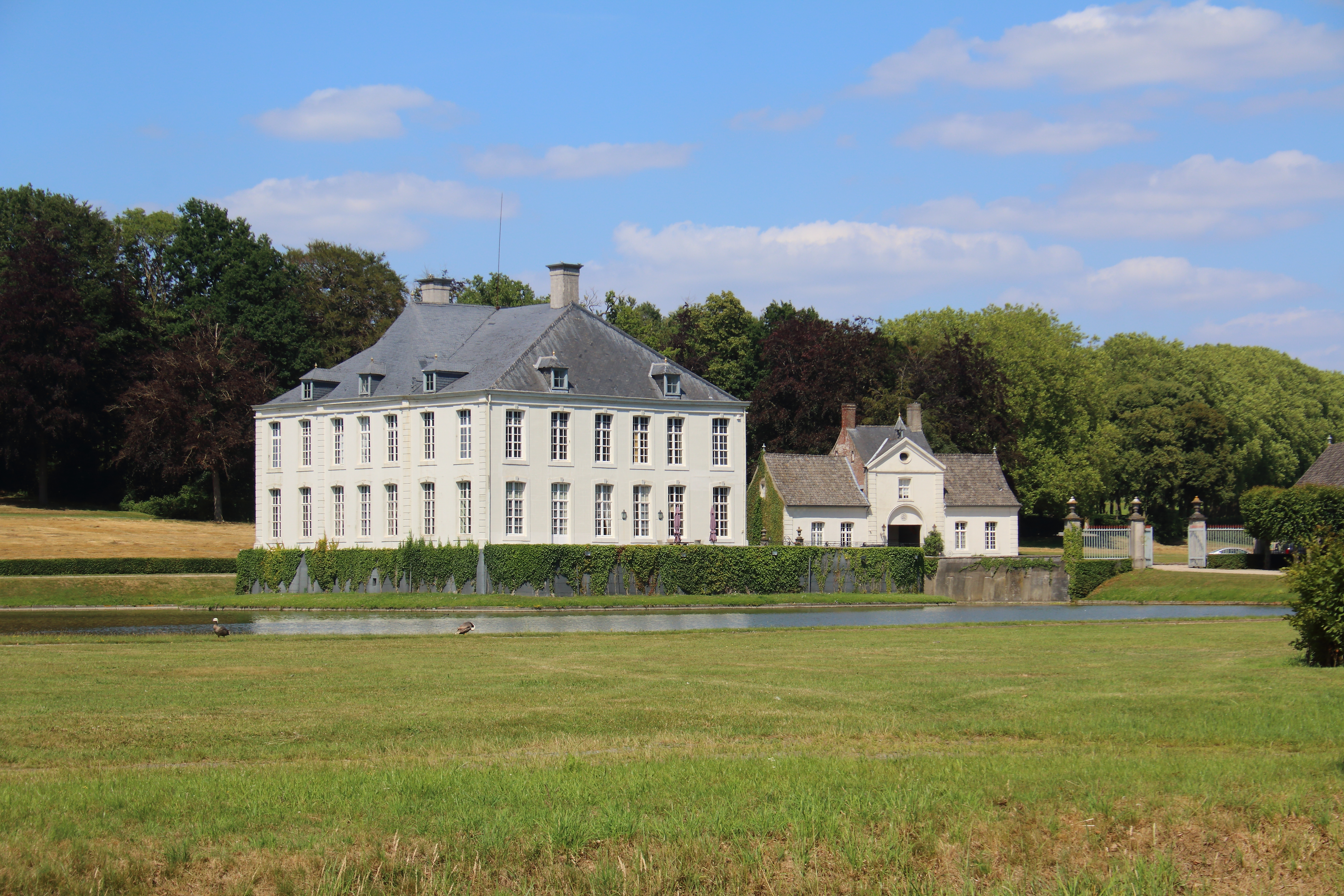
- Casier Castle

- Flag Coat of arms

- Location of Kruisem in East Flanders
- Interactive map of Kruisem
- Location in Belgium
- Coordinates: 50°54′16″N 3°31′41″E
- Country: Belgium
- Community: Flemish Community
- Region: Flemish Region
- Province: East Flanders
- Arrondissement: Oudenaarde

Government
  - Mayor: Joop Verzele (CD&V)
  - Governing party: CD&V

Area
  - Total: 71.59 km^{2} (27.64 sq mi)

Population (2022-01-01)
  - Total: 15,876
  - Density: 221.8/km^{2} (574.4/sq mi)
- Postal codes: 9750, 9770, 9771, 9772
- NIS code: 45068
- Area codes: 09
- Website: www.kruisem.be

Kruisem (Dutch pronunciation: [ˈkrœysəm]) is a municipality in the Belgian province of East Flanders that was established on 1 January 2019 from the merging of the municipalities of Kruishoutem and Zingem.

The merged municipality has an area of 71.59 km^{2} (27.64 sq mi) and a population of 15,876 people as of 2022. The municipality consists of the deelgemeentes Huise, Kruishoutem, Nokere, Ouwegem, Wannegem-Lede and Zingem.

== Creation ==
The Flemish Government provides incentives for municipalities to voluntarily merge. The municipal councils of Kruishoutem and Zingem approved a merge in 2017, which was ratified by Flemish decree of 4 May 2018 alongside several other merges, all to be effective per 1 January 2019.

As of 1 January 2018, the municipality of Kruishoutem had a population of 8,086 and Zingem a population of 7,552.

== Government ==
The first elections for the new municipality were held during the regular local elections of 14 October 2018, electing a municipal council for the legislative period of 2019–2024. Christian Democratic and Flemish obtained a majority of seats on the municipal council (14 out of 25). Joop Verzele became mayor of Kruisem.
