= Arrondissement of Oudenaarde =

Arrondissement in East Flanders

Arrondissement of Oudenaarde Arrondissement Oudenaarde
- Arrondissement
- Location of the arrondissement in East Flanders
- Coordinates: 50.85°N 3.6°E
- Country: Belgium
- Region: Flanders
- Province: East Flanders
- Municipalities: 11 (until 2018); 10 (since 2019)

Area
  - Total: 418.80 km^{2} (161.70 sq mi)

Population (1 January 2017)
  - Total: 123,330
  - Density: 294.48/km^{2} (762.71/sq mi)
- Time zone: UTC+1 (CET)
  - Summer (DST): UTC+2 (CEST)

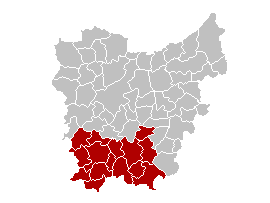
Location of the judicial arrondissement in East Flanders

The Arrondissement of Oudenaarde (Dutch: Arrondissement Oudenaarde; French: Arrondissement d'Audenarde) is one of the six administrative arrondissements in the Province of East Flanders, Belgium. It is both an administrative and a judicial arrondissement. However, the Judicial Arrondissement of Oudenaarde also comprises the municipalities of Geraardsbergen, Herzele, Sint-Lievens-Houtem and Zottegem in the Arrondissement of Aalst.

== Municipalities ==
The Administrative Arrondissement of Oudenaarde consists of the following municipalities:

- Brakel
- Horebeke
- Kluisbergen
- Kruisem
- Lierde
- Maarkedal
- Oudenaarde
- Ronse
- Wortegem-Petegem
- Zwalm

Per 1 January 2019, the municipalities of Kruishoutem and Zingem merged into the new municipality of Kruisem.
