= Zwalm (river) =

River in Belgium

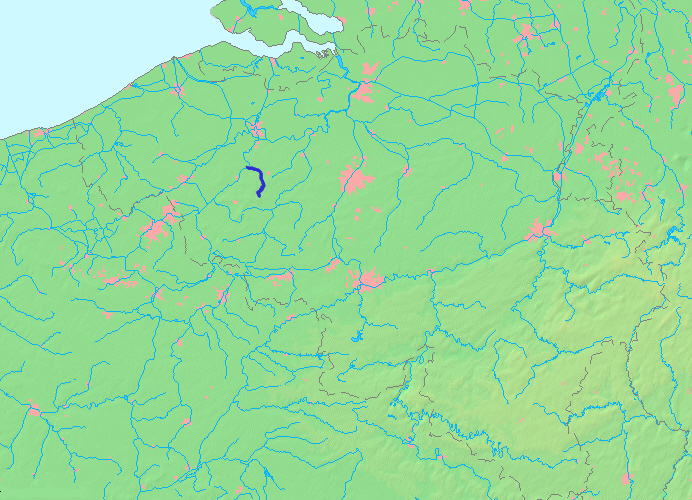

Location
- Country: Belgium

Physical characteristics
- Source: Brakel
- Mouth: Schelde
  - location: Border between Nederzwalm and Welden
  - coordinates: 50°53′20″N 3°40′04″E
- Length: 14 km (8.7 mi)

The Zwalm or Zwalmbeek is a tributary of the Scheldt and one of the main watercourses in the Flemish Ardennes in the southern part of the Belgian province of East Flanders.

== Geography ==
The Zwalm Basin (Zwalmbekken) is located almost entirely in the province of East Flanders, with only a small section in the vicinity of Vloesberg extending into Hainaut Province.

The Zwalm receives water from the municipalities of Flobecq, Brakel, Zottegem, Horebeke, Oudenaarde, and Zwalm. The municipality of Zwalm is named after the Zwalm stream.

The source area of the Zwalm is located in Vloesberg, where it comprises the upper reaches of the Zwalm, each with its own name. The highest point in this source area is at 150 meters above TAW (Tweede Algemene Waterpassing). The Zwalm itself is formed in Brakel from its upper reaches, including the Dorenbosbeek (rising in the Livierenbos), the Verrebeek (rising in the Livierenbos and Hayesbos in the Everbeekse Forests), and the Sassegembeek (rising in the Brakelbos). After Brakel, the Zwalm also flows through the municipalities of Zottegem and Zwalm.

The non-navigable Zwalm, along with the Ronne and the Maarkebeek, is the main tributary of the Scheldt River between Tournai and Ghent. The maximum length of the Zwalm is 21.8 kilometers, of which approximately 14 kilometers bear its own name (downstream from Brakel).

Nederzwalm is located at the confluence of the Zwalm and the Boekelbeek, the main tributary of the Zwalm. This tributary originates in Zegelsem and also receives water from the municipality of Horebeke. The Zwalm flows into the Scheldt River on the border between Welden and Nederzwalm.

Characteristic features include its banks in the Zwalm Valley and the waterfalls of the Zwalm. The left bank is gradual sloping, while the right bank is steep.

In Nederzwalm, there is a measuring station. The average flow rate measured is 0.80 m³/s. However, the flow rate of the Zwalm stream can vary significantly and rapidly between 0.60 m³/s and 1 m³/s.

Since the implementation of a water purification program, which began in 1989, including a water purification station in Bruggenhoek in Roborst, the water quality in the Zwalm has improved significantly.

== Etymology ==
The Zwalm River is first described in 1040 as fluviolum Swalma.

There is little doubt about the origin of the name Zwalm. Swalm was Middle Dutch for vapor, mist, or fume. Therefore, it refers to the steaming or vaporous river.

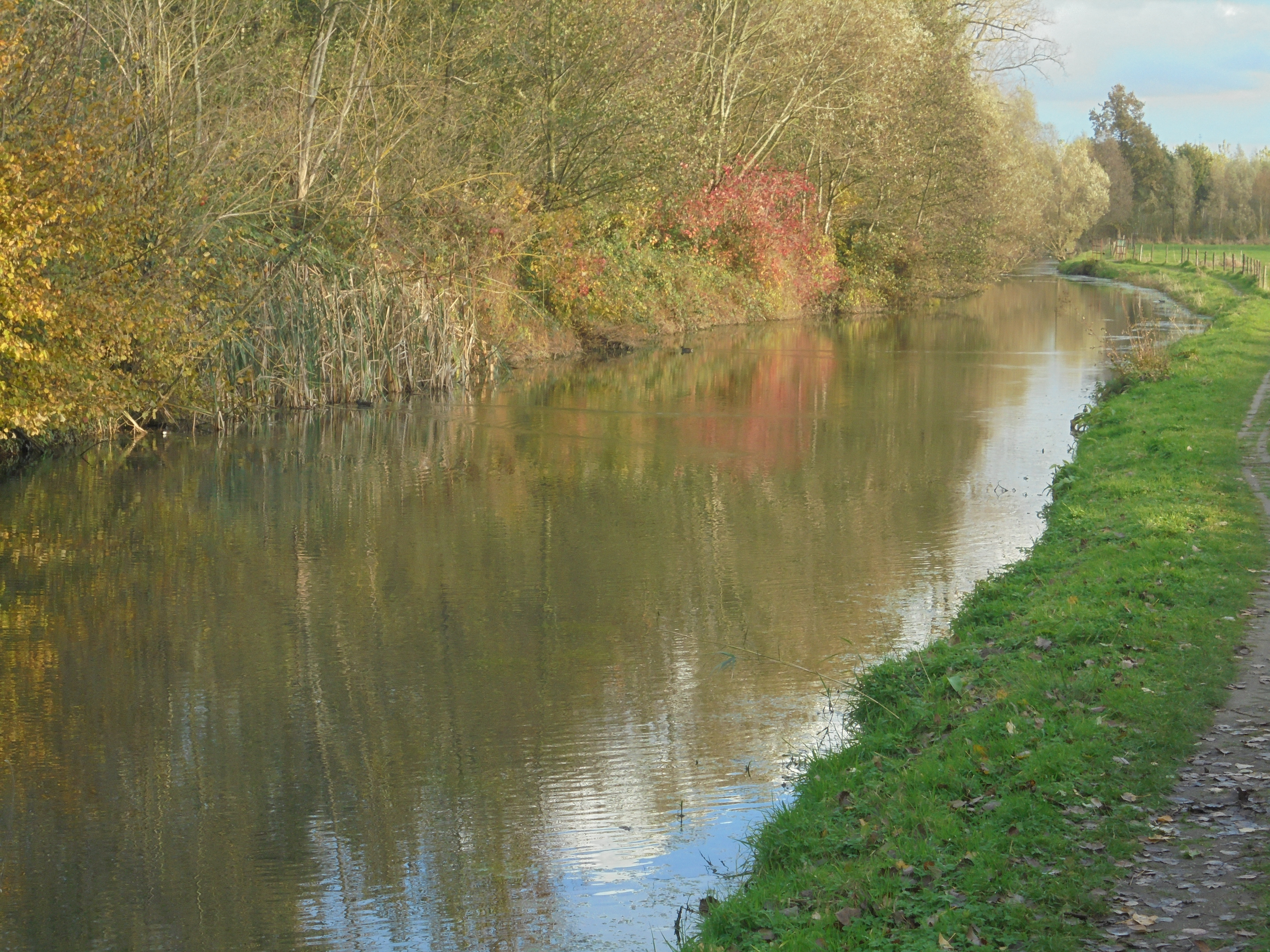
The Zwalm and the Gaverbos

== History ==
At the Roman invasion in 57 BC, the region around the Zwalm River was inhabited by the Nervii. The Romans established a significant military camp in Velzeke. The Roman road from Boulogne-sur-Mer to Cologne passed through Nederzwalm and Velzeke. Another road led from Bavay to Velzeke. Numerous Roman and Gallo-Roman coins and pottery have been found throughout the Zwalm region. In the Middle Ages, in 976, the monks of St. Bavo's Abbey in Ghent founded a settlement at 'Ten Berge,' northeast of the confluence of the Wijlegemse stream into the Zwalm. Hence, the name Munkzwalm. Nederzwalm was under the control of the Abbey of Ename.

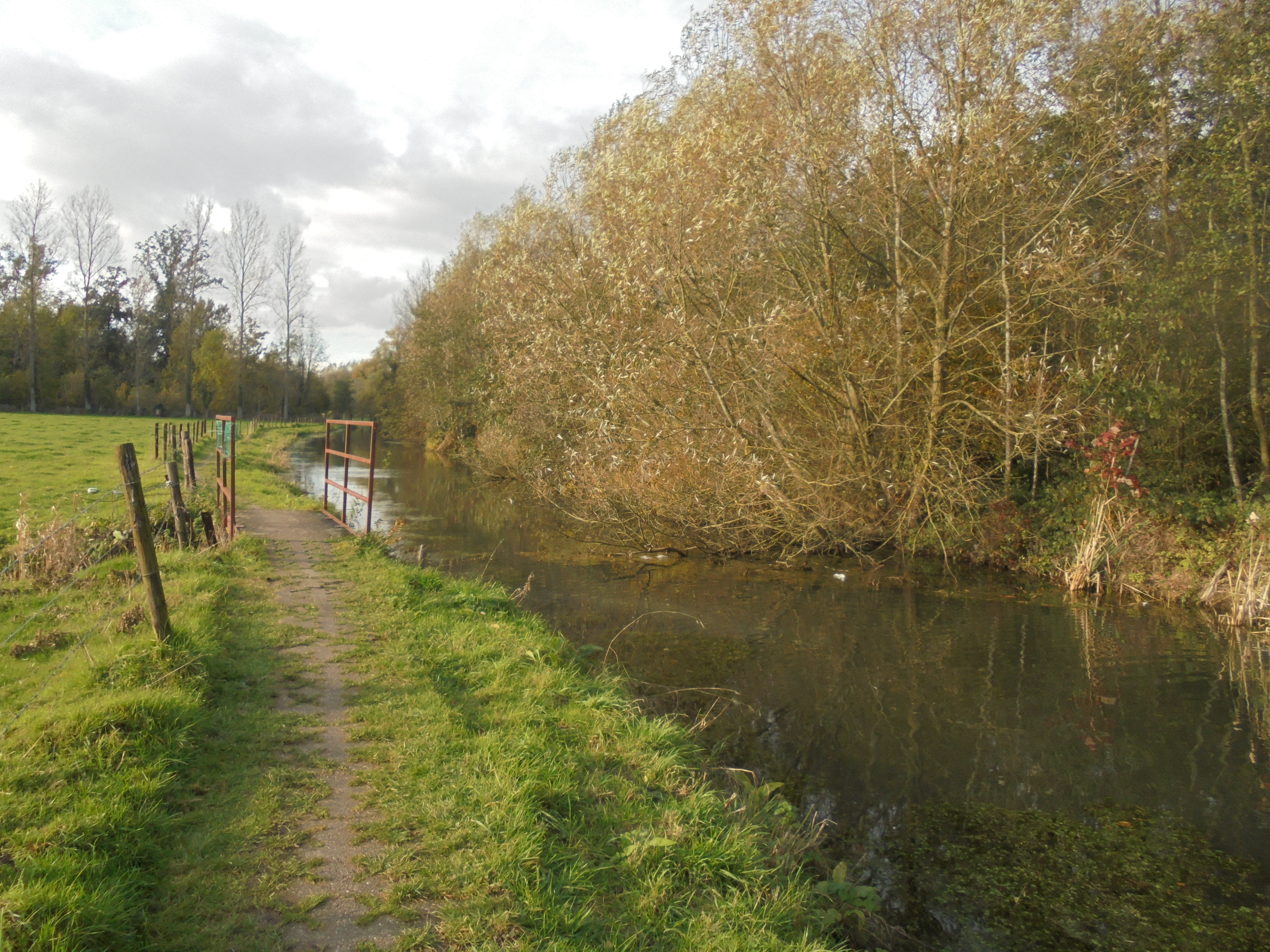
The Zwalm en het Gaverbos

== Fish Population ==
The Institute for Nature and Forest Research of the Scientific Institution of the Flemish Community conducted various surveys of the fish in the Zwalm River and several of its tributaries. Fish ladders were built at several locations (including the Boembekemolen), with the exception of the Zwalmmolen.

The most recent survey was conducted on April 18 and 19, 2005. The number of fish species ranged from 10 to 14, and the composition varied over the years depending on the location. The following 11 species were caught in the Zwalm: perch, roach, three-spined stickleback, gudgeon, carp, chub (reintroduced in 2000), eel, rudd, European bitterling, pike, and tench. The most fish-rich zone, both in terms of quantity and diversity of species, remains the downstream area with the Zwalm Mill pool.

During a study of the fish ladder at the Ter Biest Mill from April 4 to June 29, 2007, 22 fish species were found. Over 1,100 fish swam through this fish ladder in three months. The species found at that time, in order of abundance, were roach, European bitterling, spirlin, eel, three-spined stickleback, perch, gudgeon, carp, chub, blue bream, bream, river lamprey, European weatherfish, common bleak, smelt, rudd, tench, common minnow, Eurasian ruffe, vimba bream, sunbleak (reintroduced in 2015), and American brook lamprey. The length of the measured fish ranged from 4.5 to 65 cm. In 2016, it was decided to reintroduce the brook trout. European bullhead is also found in the Zwalm basin (including in the Sassegembeek, Traveinsbeek, and Maarkebeek).

At the mouth of the Zwalm, beavers inhabit the area.

== Watermills ==
The gradient of the Zwalm river is 1.5 meters per kilometer, and this gradient has been put to practical use for the construction of watermills. Notable are some of the 13 watermills in the Zwalm basin, of which 5 are located on the Zwalm itself.

- Slijpkotmolen on the Slijpkotbeek in Nederbrakel
- Driesmolen on the Molenbeek in Velzeke
- Molen Van den Borre on the Traveinsbeek in Strijpen
- Watermolen van Elene on the Molenbeek in Elene
- Boembekemolen on the Zwalm in Michelbeke
- Bostmolen on the Zwalm in Roborst
- Pedes molen on the Passemaregracht in Hundelgem
- Zwalmmolen on the Zwalm in Munkzwalm
- IJzerkotmolen on the Zwalm in Sint-Maria-Latem
- Perlinckmolen on the Peerdestok- or Boekelbeek in Elst
- Moldergemmolen on the Boekelbeek in Sint-Denijs-Boekel
- Vanderlindensmolen on the Boekelbeek in Nederzwalm
- Ter Biestmolen on the Zwalm in Nederzwalm

== Gallery ==
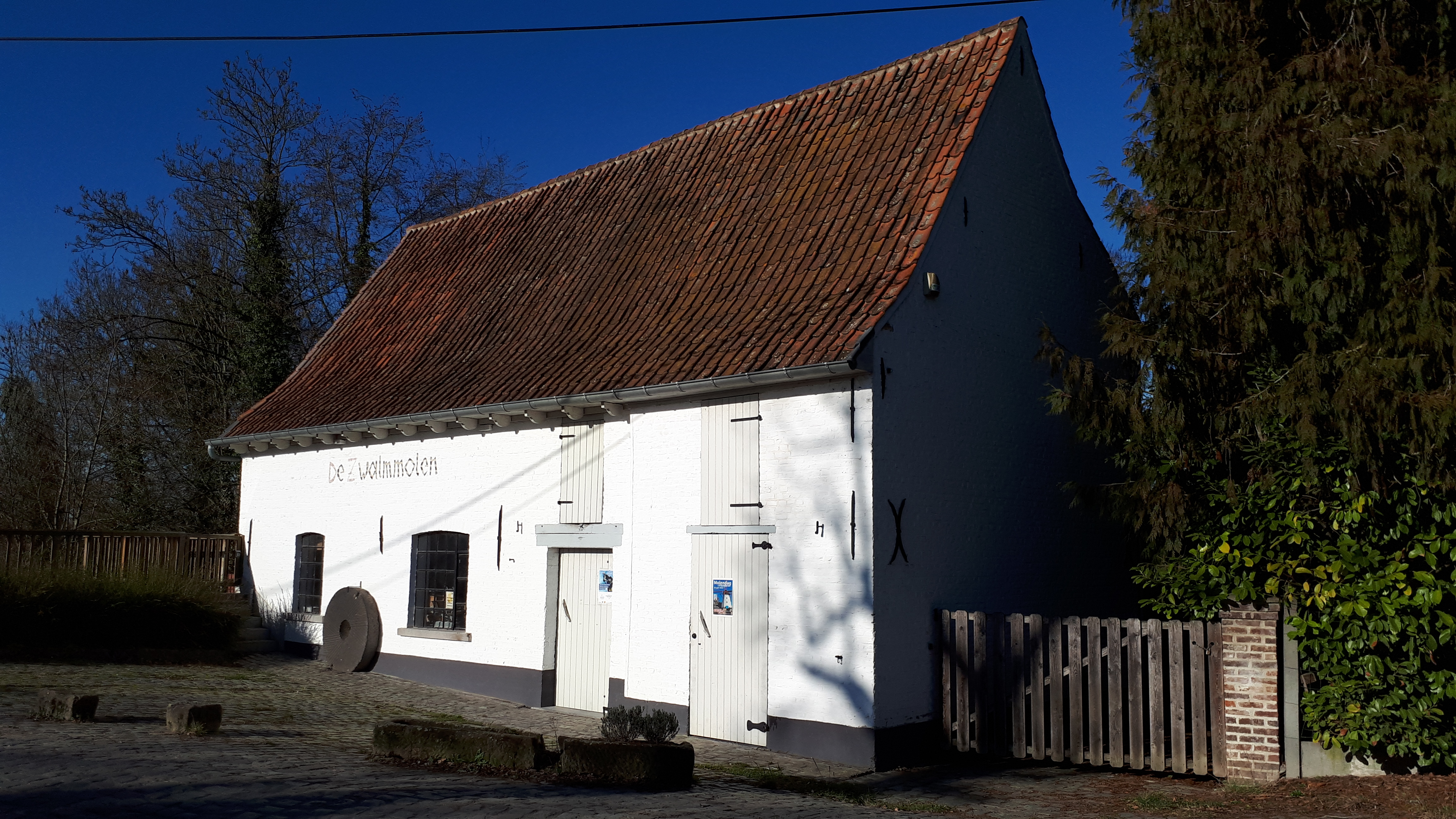
Zwalmmolen

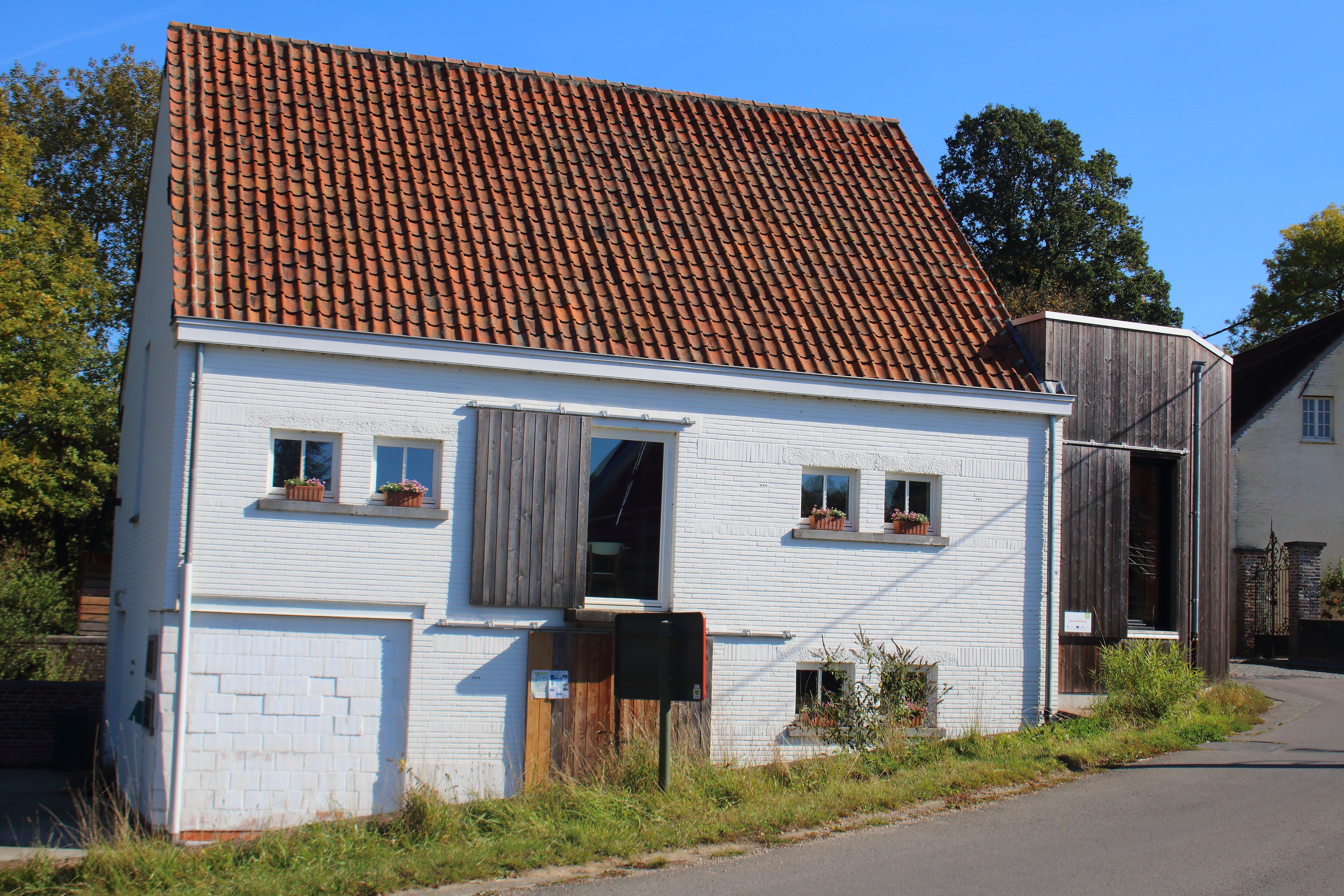
Bloembekemolen

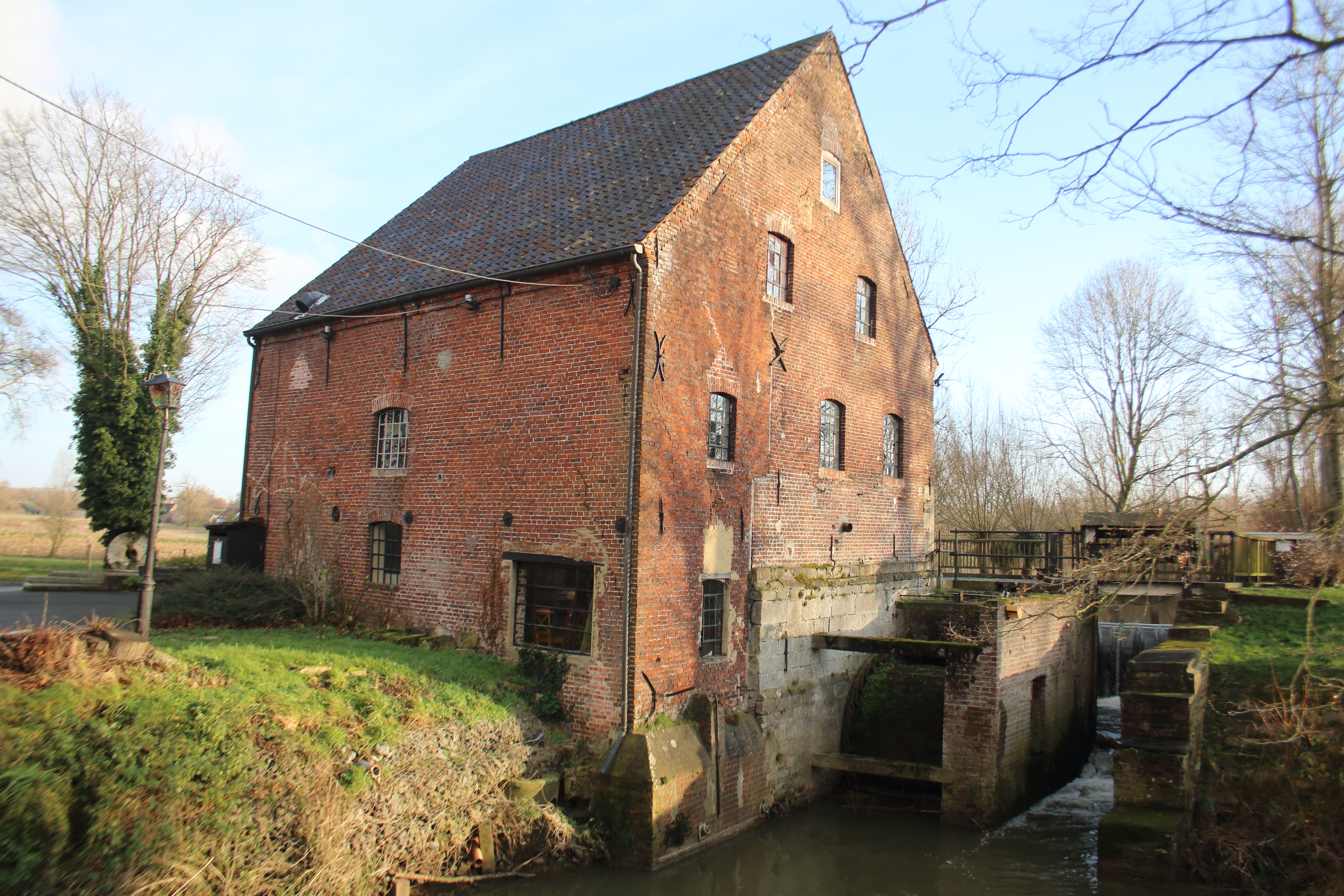
Bostmolen

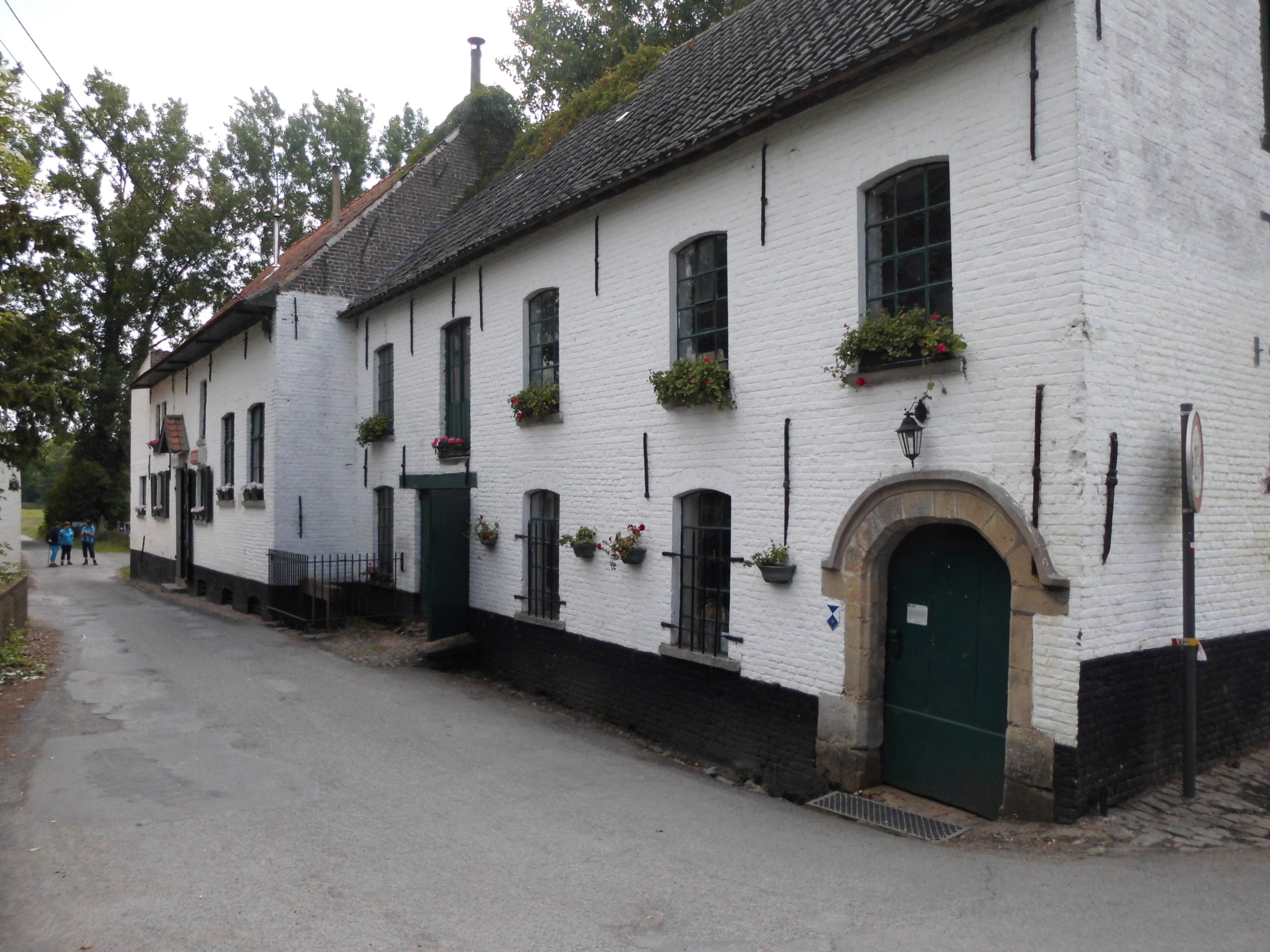
Ijzerkotmolen

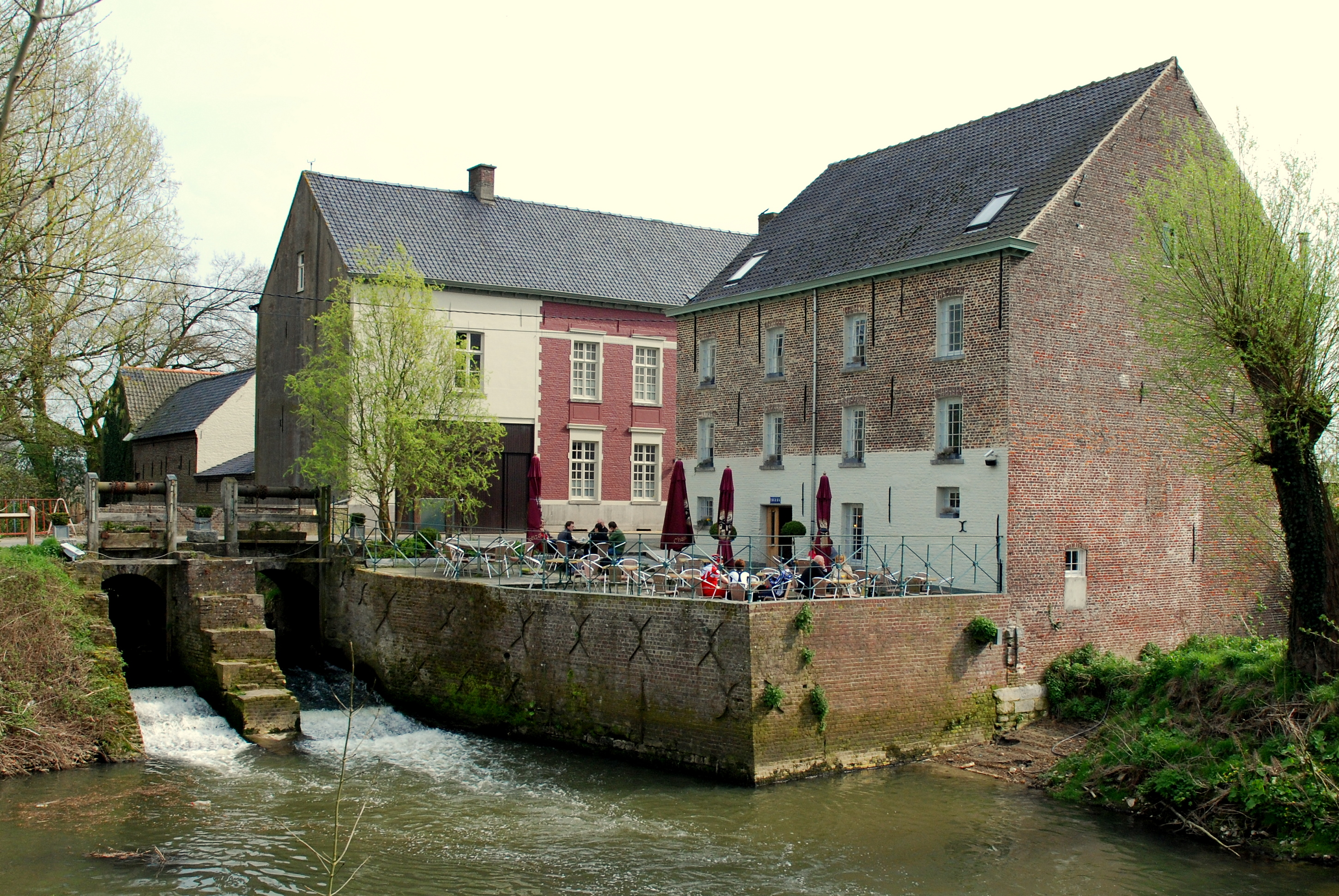
Ter Biestmolen

== Tourism ==
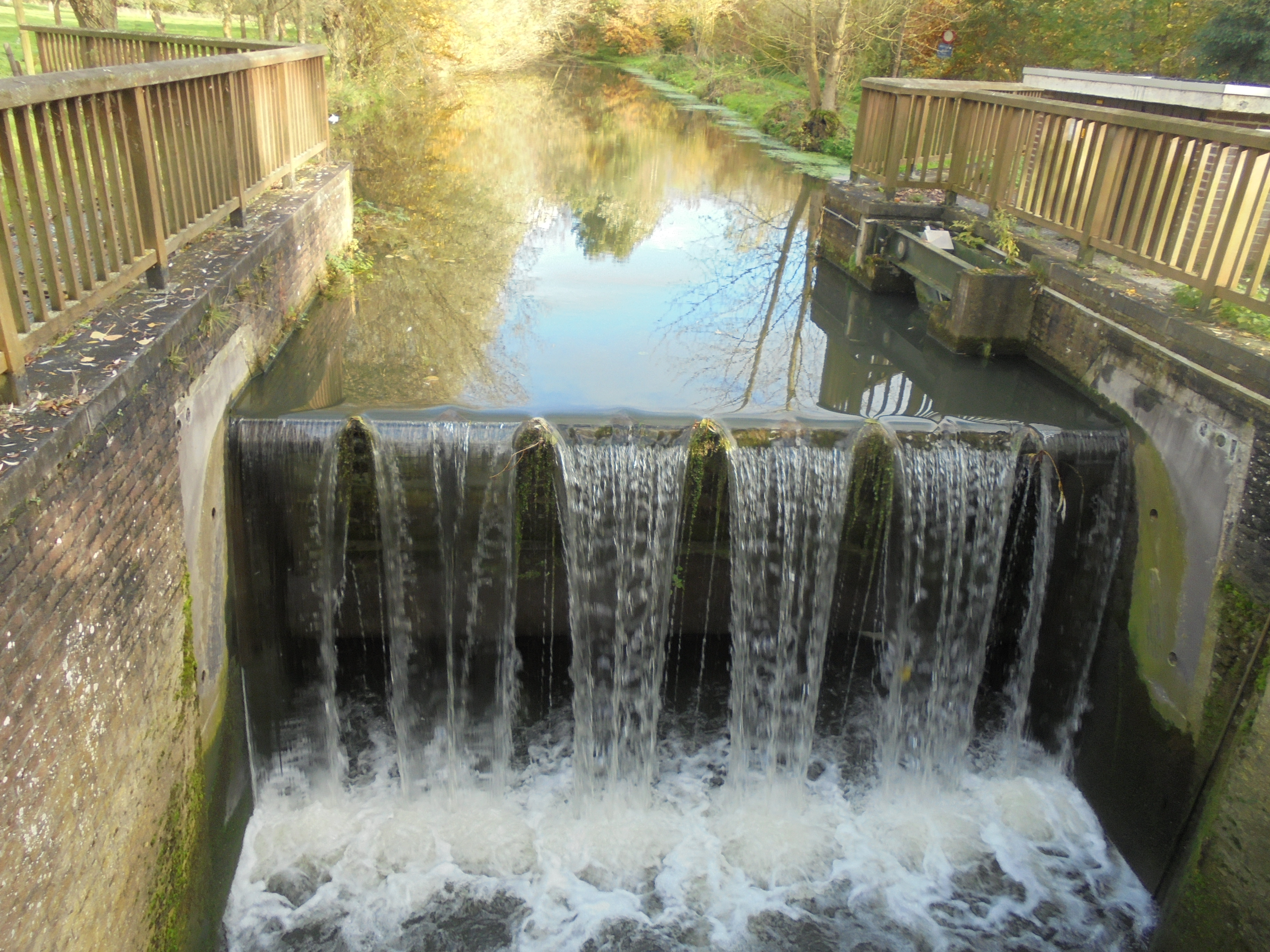
Waterfall at Klein Switzerland

In the Zwalm region, much like in the rest of the Flemish Ardennes, day tourism is a predominant activity. In the source areas, you can find the Everbeekse forests, Brakelbos, and Livierenbos, all of which are accessible. Nature reserves like Kloosterbos, Steenbergse forests, Burreken, Perlinkvallei, Munkbosbeekvallei, Bovenlopen Zwalm, and Middenloop Zwalm are also accessible. A portion of the dismantled railway line from Zottegem via Flobecq to Ellezelles has now become a paved walking and cycling path known as the Miner's Path. Along this path, completely free of car traffic, you can follow the Zwalm valley from Opbrakel to Zottegem. You can also follow the Zwalmbeek from Opbrakel to its confluence with the Scheldt in Nederzwalm via a footpath starting from Moriaan and Jan de Lichtepad in Velzeke.

The Zwalm region is well known among cycling enthusiasts, especially for its hills and cobblestone roads.

- Valkenberg in Brakel
- Kasteeldreef, Elverenberg-Vossenhol near Sint-Maria-Oudenhove
- Leberg in Zegelsem
- Haaghoek between Zegelsem and Horebeke
- Berendries in Michelbeke
- Paddestraat and Lippenhovestraat, Langendries, Slijpstraat-Kortendries, Kloosterbosstraat in Zottegem
- Molenberg in Sint-Denijs-Boekel

There are several signposted hiking and cycling routes (Watermill Route), number-node cycle network (Flemish Ardennes), a hiking node network Flemish Ardennes - Zwalm Valley, Streek-GR Vlaamse Ardennen, and a similarly signposted car route (Flemish Ardennes Route).

The Zwalm region is accessible by train and bus. There are train stations in Zottegem, Munkzwalm, and Sint-Denijs-Boekel.

The lower course of the Zwalm and its dammed sections are navigable by small rowing boats and canoes. In the past, the Zwalm was used for recreational boating. Boating on the Zwalmbeek was rare for several years due to pollution, but thanks to the water purification station in Roborst, boating on the Zwalm is once again attractive.
