= Berendries =

Coordinates: 50.8336°N 3.7747°E

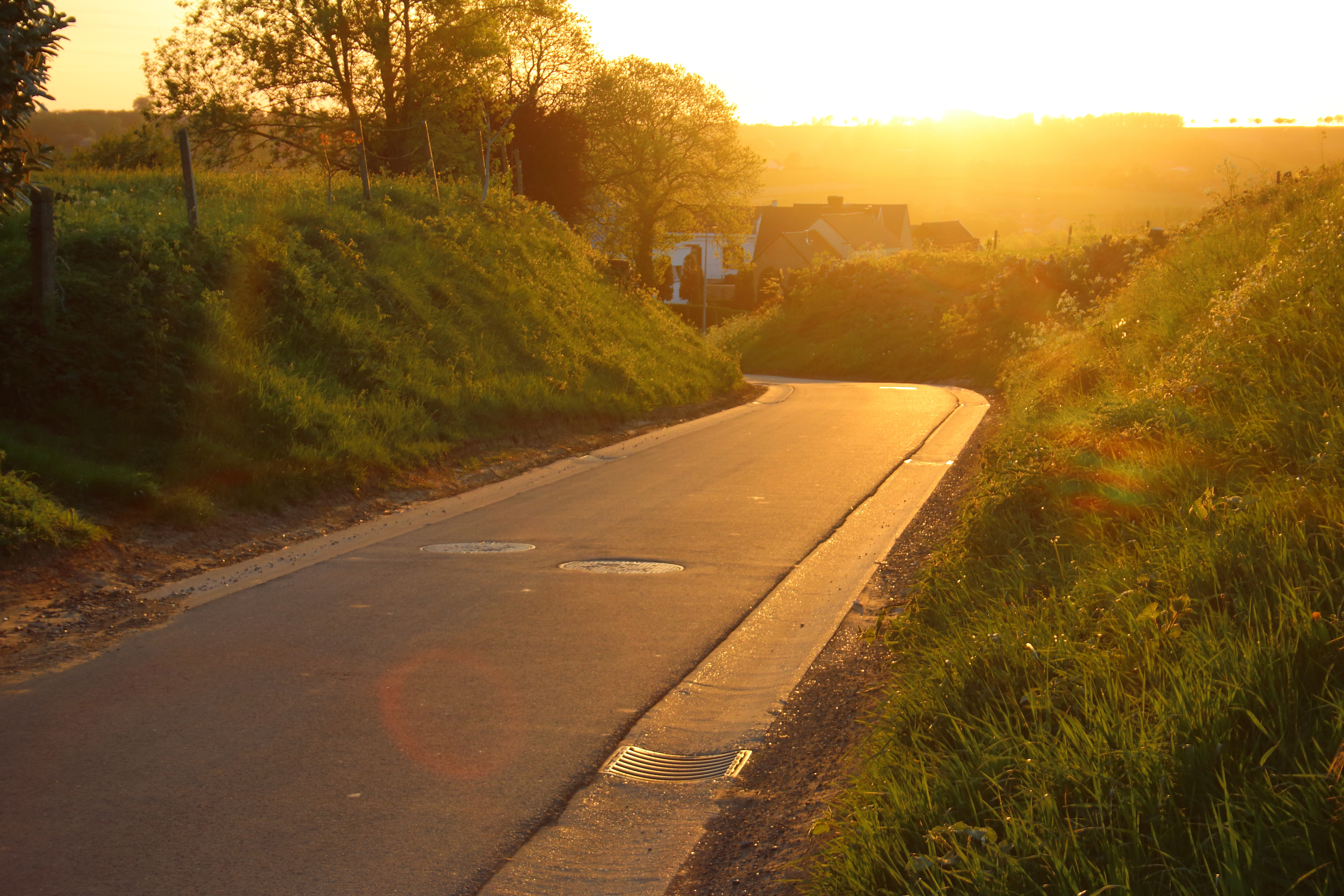
- Top of the Berendries at sunset
- Location: Flanders, Belgium
- Start: Michelbeke
- Gain in altitude: 65.8 m (216 ft)
- Length of climb: 936 m (3,071 ft)
- Maximum elevation: 98 m (322 ft)
- Average gradient: 7.1 %
- Maximum gradient: 12.3 %

The Berendries is an uphill street in Michelbeke, part of the municipality of Brakel, in the Belgian province of East Flanders. Its summit reaches 98 m altitude, making it the highest hill of the Zwalm region, just north of the Flemish Ardennes. The road has an asphalt surface and links the valley town of Michelbeke to the hilltop town of Sint-Maria-Oudenhove.

== Cycling ==
The climb is best known from road bicycle racing, where it regularly features in the Flemish races in spring, most notably the Tour of Flanders. The Berendries is just under one kilometer and has an average gradient of 7% with its steepest point, 12.1%, coming in the middle of the climb.

The climb is also regularly included in Dwars door Vlaanderen, the Three Days of De Panne, the Eneco Tour and the Tour of Flanders for Women.
