= Leberg =

Coordinates: 50.8277°N 3.7239°E

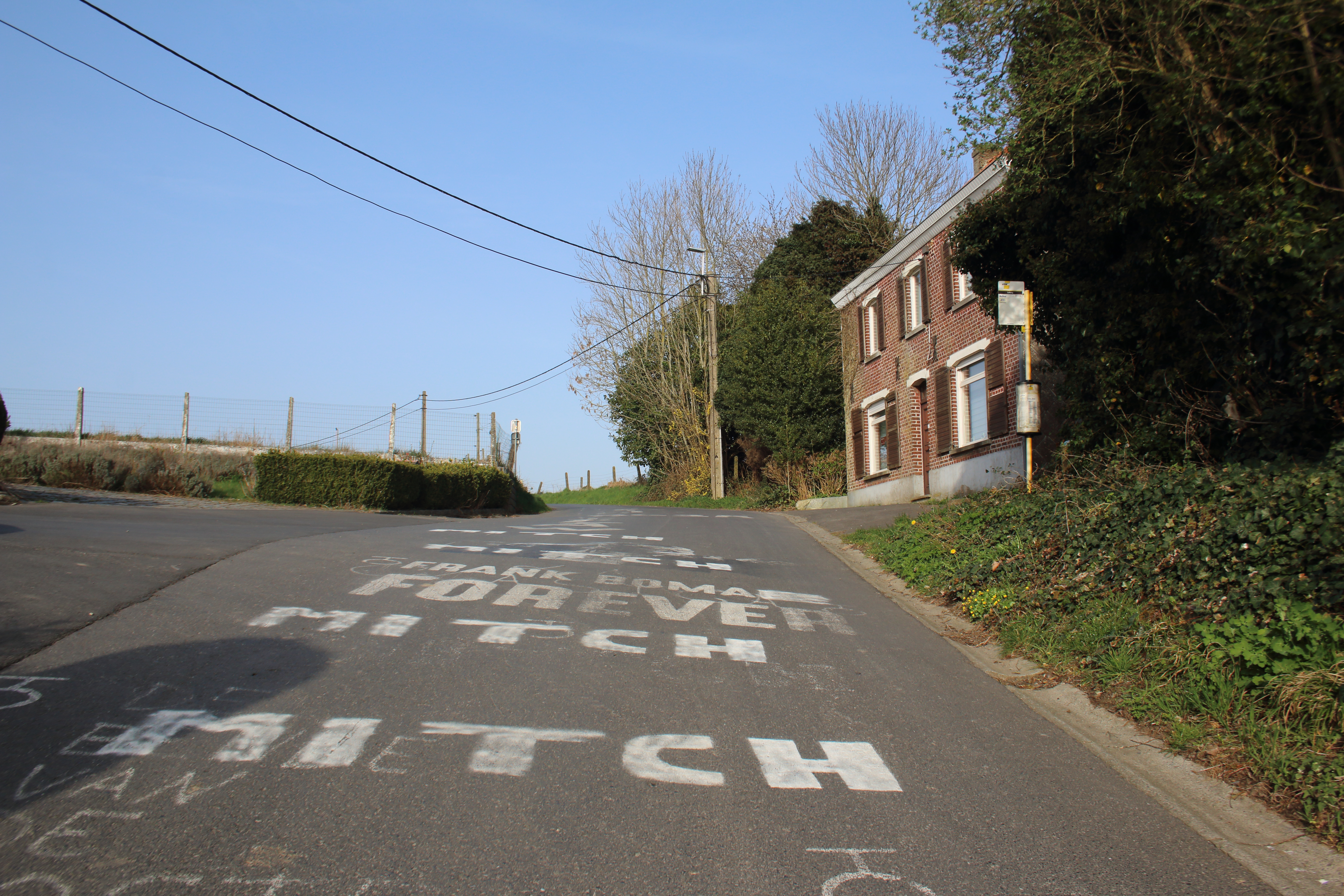
- Location: Flanders, Belgium
- Start: Elst
- Gain in altitude: 45 m (148 ft)
- Length of climb: 700 m (2,300 ft)
- Maximum elevation: 99 m (325 ft)
- Average gradient: 6.1 %
- Maximum gradient: 14 %

The Leberg is a hill and uphill street in Elst, part of the municipality of Brakel, in the Belgian province of East Flanders. Its top is at 99 m altitude, making it one of the highest hills of the Zwalm region, just north of the Flemish Ardennes. The road has an asphalt surface and links the valley town of Elst to the hilltop town of Zegelsem.

== Cycling ==
The climb is best known from road bicycle racing, where it regularly features in the Flemish races in spring, most notably the Tour of Flanders. The Leberg is 700 m high, and has an average gradient of 6.1% with its steepest point, 14%, in a right-hand curve at the bottom of the climb. The upper half of the climb is less steep, but runs exposed through fields and acres, causing wind to have a significant influence sometimes.

The climb is also regularly included in Omloop Het Nieuwsblad, Dwars door Vlaanderen, the Three Days of De Panne, the Eneco Tour and the Tour of Flanders for Women.
