= Paddestraat =

Coordinates: 50.5249°N 3.4619°E

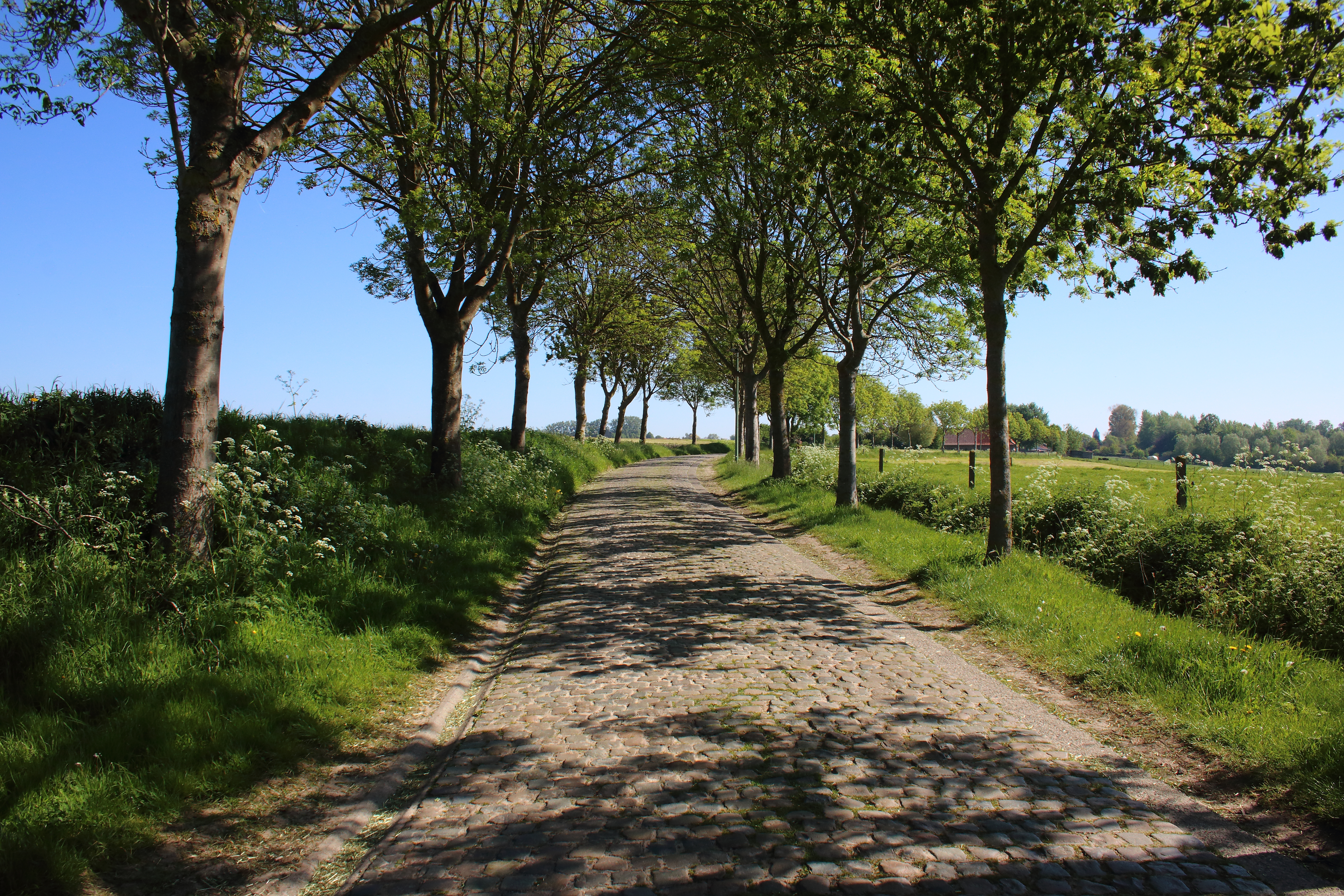
The cobbled surface of the Paddestraat in Zottegem.

The Paddestraat (English: Toad Street) is a 2.3 km long cobbled road in the municipality of Zottegem, in East Flanders, Belgium. The road is a regular location of the springtime cycling classics in Flanders. In 1995, the cobbled road of the Paddestraat was classified as a protected monument by the Flemish government.

== Characteristics ==
The road is situated entirely in Zottegem. The cobbled part starts at the bridge over the Zwalm, a small river at 18 m altitude, on the border between Zwalm and Zottegem. It runs northeasterly towards the Roman Square in Velzeke, a part of Zottegem, at 50 m altitude. Most altitude gain happens in the first 800 m, before flattening out in the latter 1.500 m, totalling ca. 2.350 m of cobbled surface.

The road dates back to Roman times, when it was a part of the historic road from Boulogne-sur-Mer to Cologne. An archeological museum, the archaeological museum of Velzeke, is situated at the northeasterly entrance of the Paddestraat. Some important archeological findings from Gallo-Roman culture, including the bronze Venus of Velzeke, were made at the site. The Dutch name of the road (English: Toad Street) is taken from the common toad, which are found in large number at the site near the river during mating season.

== Cycling ==
The site is best known from cycling, as it is a regular feature in the Tour of Flanders. The Paddestraat was first included in the course in 1973, and has been a fixed location in both the men's and women's race, except for the 1988 event, when the road was under repair, and in 2010 when the parcours took a more southerly course. A monument at the beginning of the street in Velzeke lists the winners of the editions that featured the Paddestraat. The Paddestraat also features occasionally in Omloop Het Nieuwsblad, Dwars door Vlaanderen and the Tour of Belgium, as well as many junior and U-23 events.

== Gallery ==
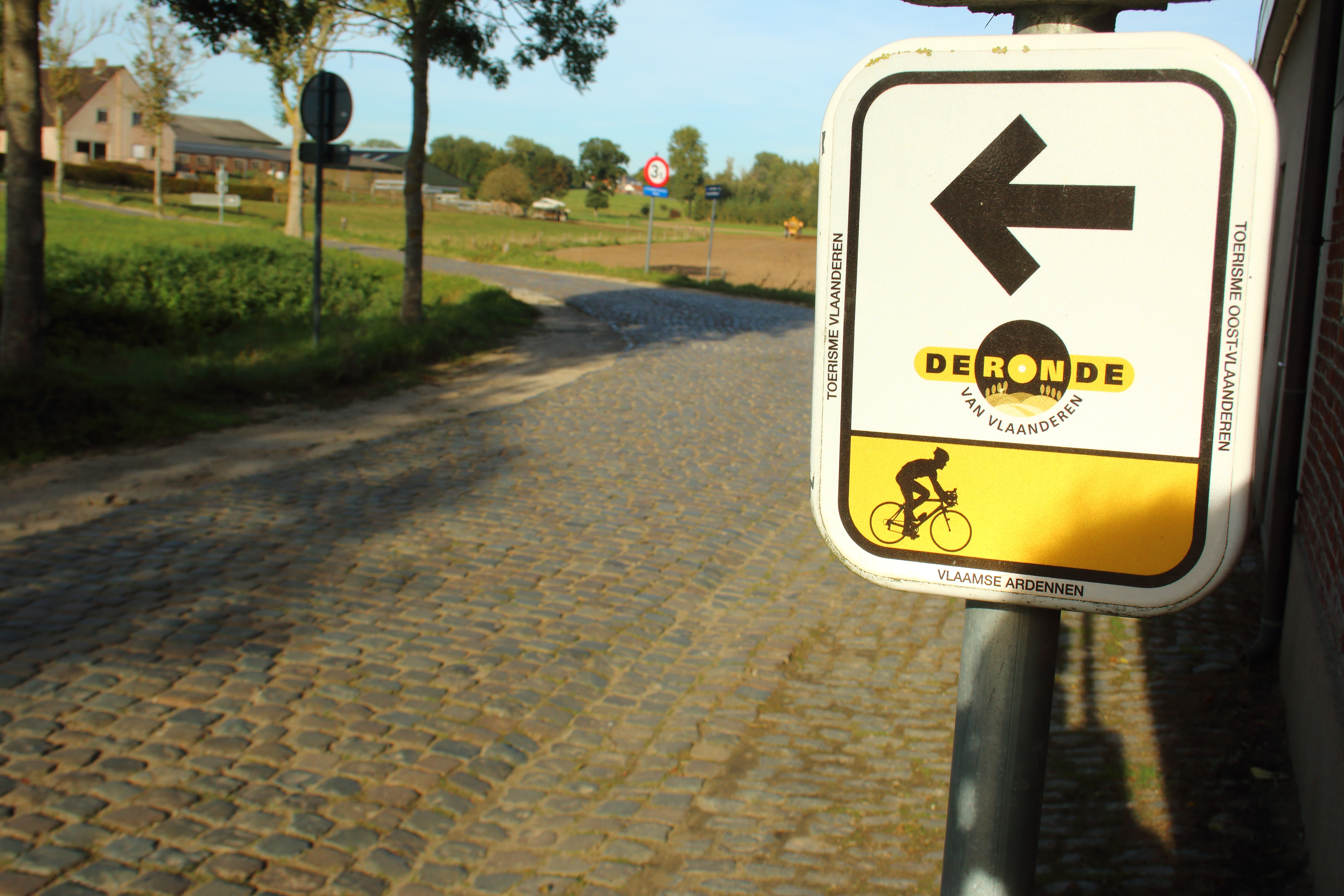

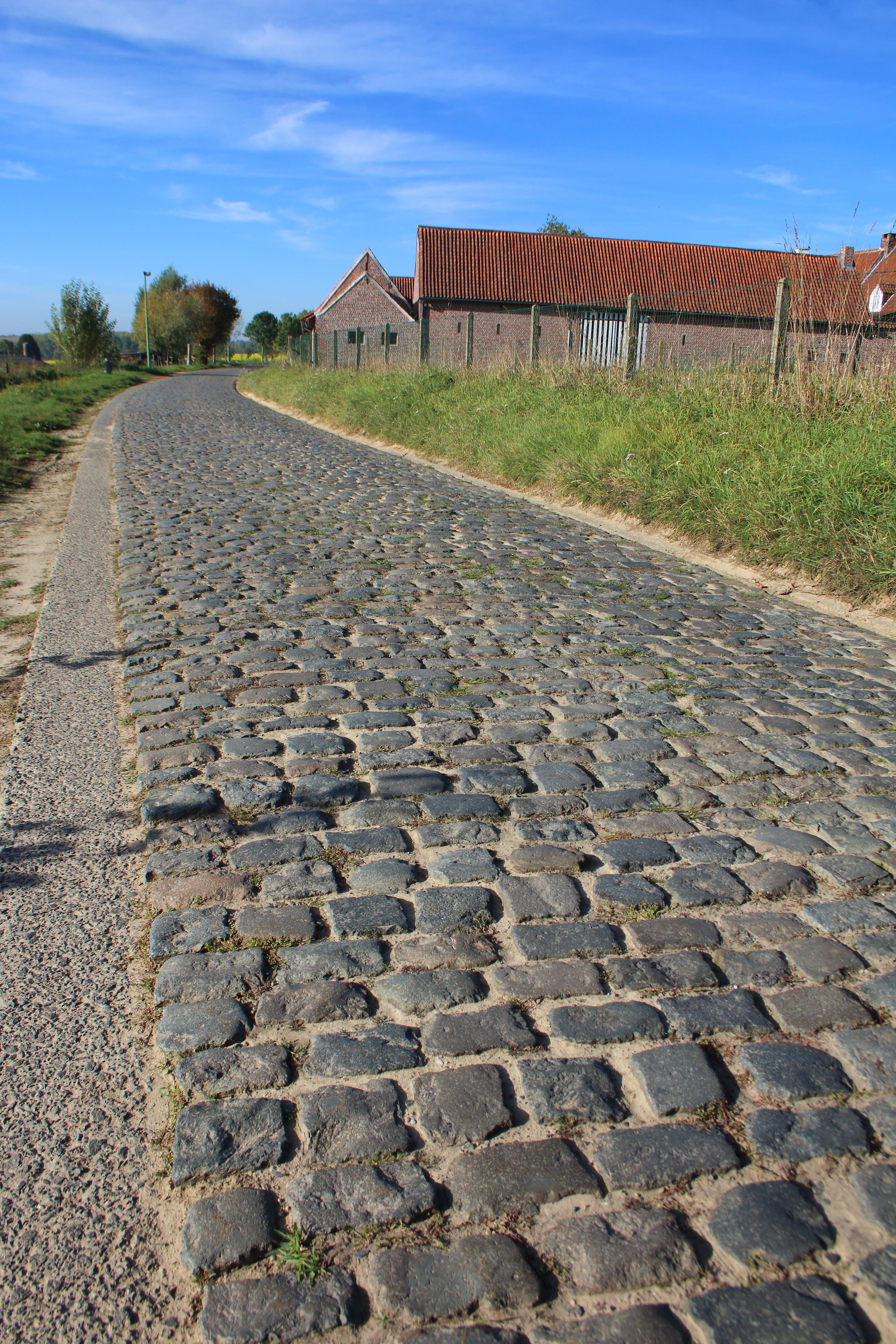

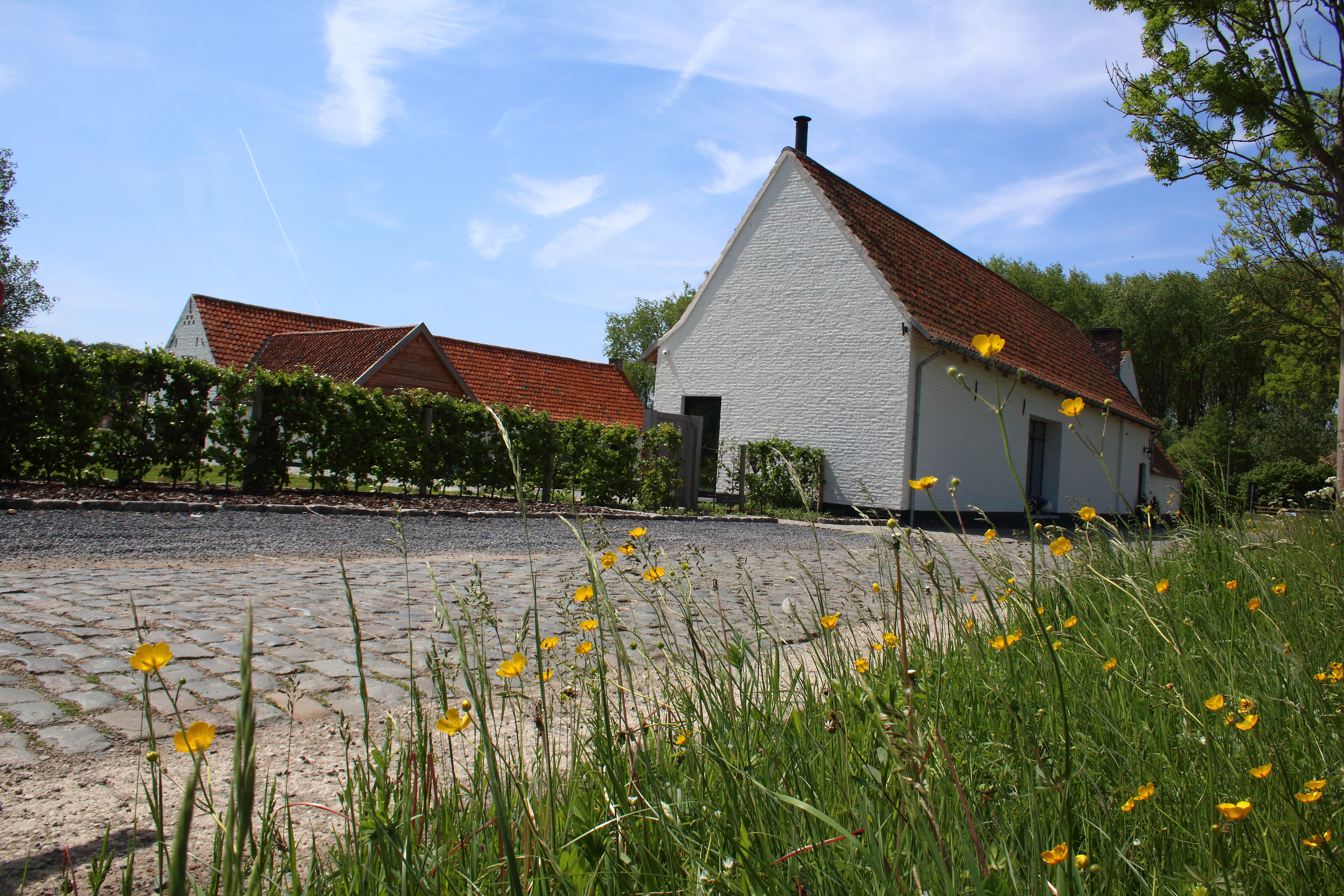

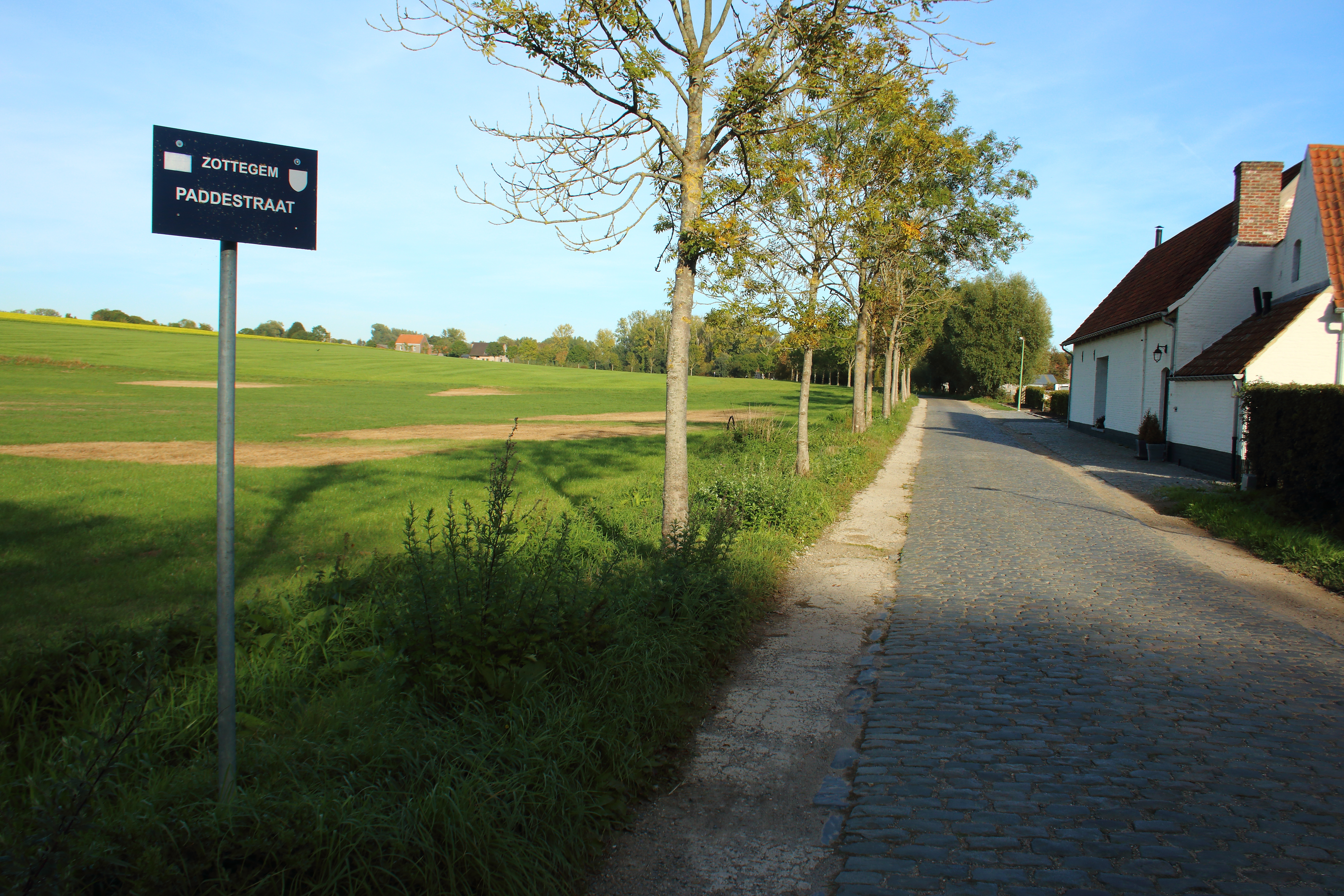
