= Flobecq =

Municipality in Hainaut Province, Wallonia, Belgium

Flobecq Flôbek (Picard): Vloesberg (Dutch)
- Municipality
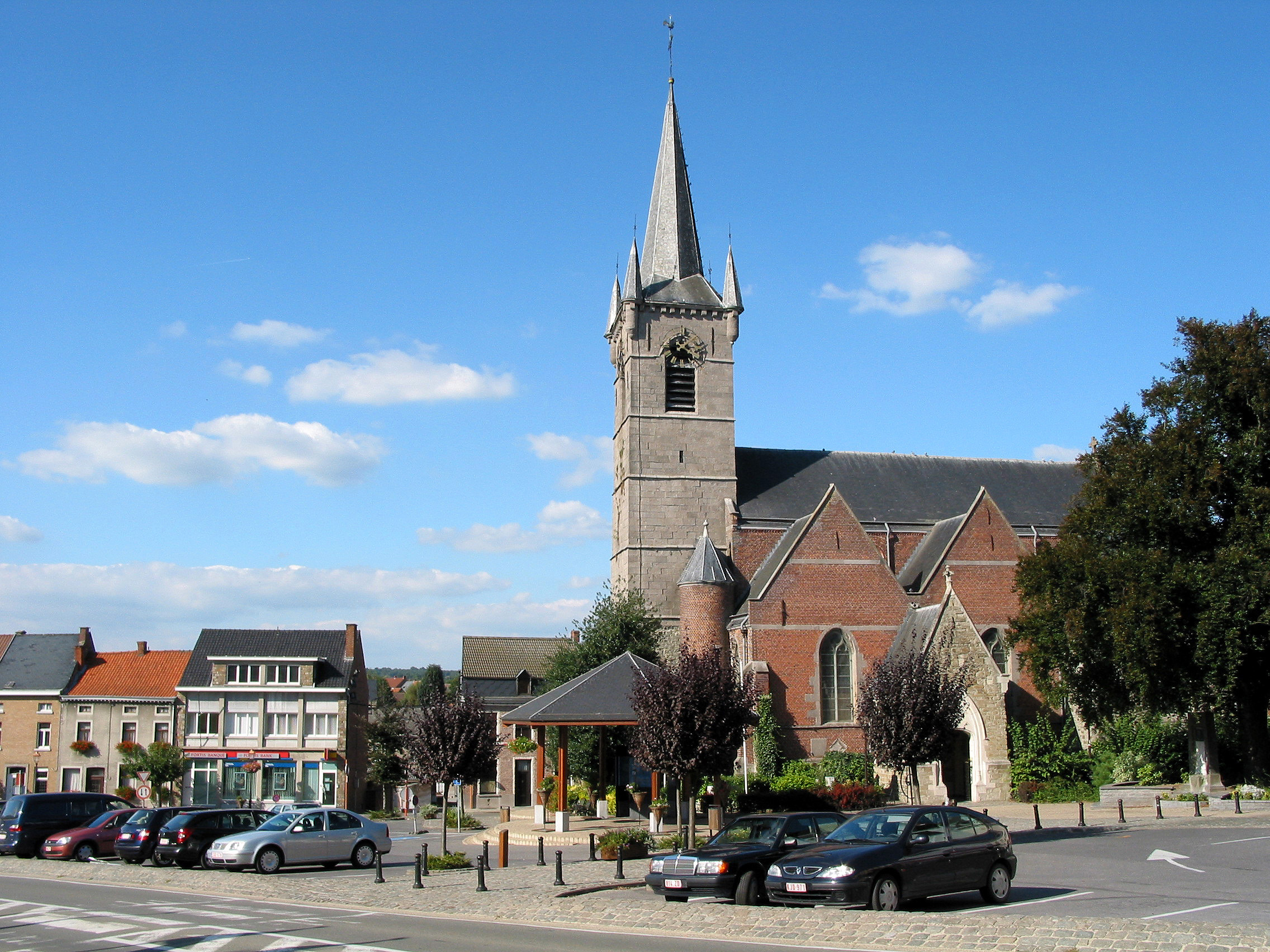

- Flag Coat of arms

- Location of Flobecq in Hainaut
- Interactive map of Flobecq
- Location in Belgium
- Coordinates: 50°44′N 03°44′E
- Country: Belgium
- Community: French Community
- Region: Wallonia
- Province: Hainaut
- Arrondissement: Ath

Government
  - Mayor: Dominique Marcil (MR)
  - Governing party: Reformist Movement

Area
  - Total: 23.28 km^{2} (8.99 sq mi)

Population (2018-01-01)
  - Total: 3,420
  - Density: 147/km^{2} (380/sq mi)
- Postal codes: 7880
- NIS code: 51019
- Area codes: 068
- Website: www.flobecq.be

Flobecq (French: [flɔbɛk]; Dutch: Vloesberg [ˈvluzbɛr(ə)x]; Picard: Flôbek) is a municipality of Wallonia located in the province of Hainaut, Belgium. It borders to the municipalities of Ellezelles (to the west) and Lessines (to the east) in the same province and to Brakel in the province of East Flanders, on the other side of the language border.

On 1 January 2025, Flobecq had a total population of 3,441 inhabitants. The total area is 23 km^{2} (8.9 sq mi) which gives a population density of 150 inhabitants per square kilometre (390/sq mi).

Flobecq is a tourist village. Each year, on the nearest Friday to 17 January, there is a marvelous local feast based on the adoration of Saint Antony.

Flobecq offers language facilities for Dutch speakers.

The mayor is Dominique Marcil (Reformist Movement).

== History ==
Flobecq was initially under strong influence of Tournai and, as in Tournai, Picard was spoken there. Since the 13th century, the area was continuously disputed between the County of Flanders and the County of Hainaut. Therefore, the region (including neighbouring places like Lessines, Ellezelles, ...) was often called "Debate Land" (French: Terre des débats, Dutch: Debattenland).

In 1963, when the language border was fixed, within the municipality of Flobecq, only the village of La Houppe/D'Hoppe was Dutch-speaking. However, the village was not transferred to Dutch-speaking East Flanders and remained in French-speaking area. Instead, Flobecq as a whole became a municipality with language facilities for Dutch.
