= Jean Henri De Coene =

Belgian painter (1798–1866)

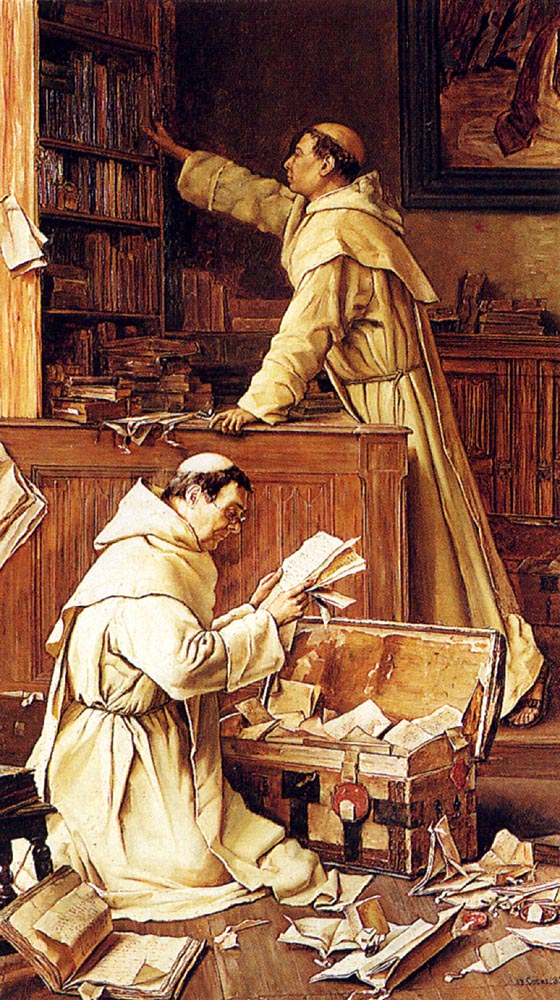
The lost manuscript

Jean Henri De Coene (1798–1866) was a Belgian painter of genre and historical subjects.

De Coene was born at Nederbrakel. He was a pupil of David and of Paelinck, and became professor in the Brussels Academy. He died in that city in 1866. His picture of the 'Incredulity of St. Thomas' gained him the prize in 1827.

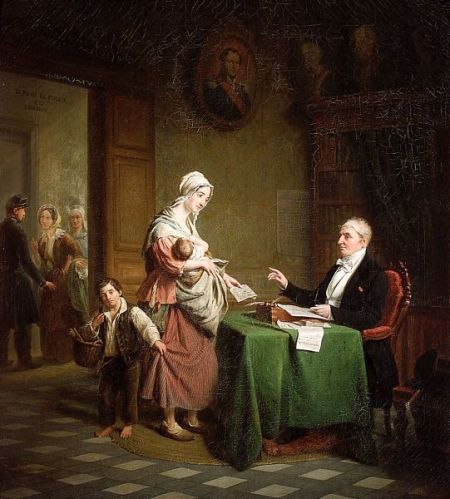
At the police station

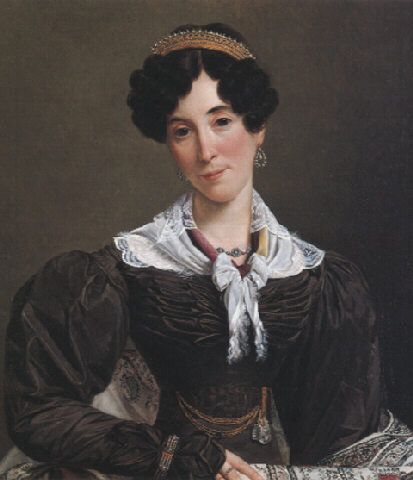
Victoire du Bois

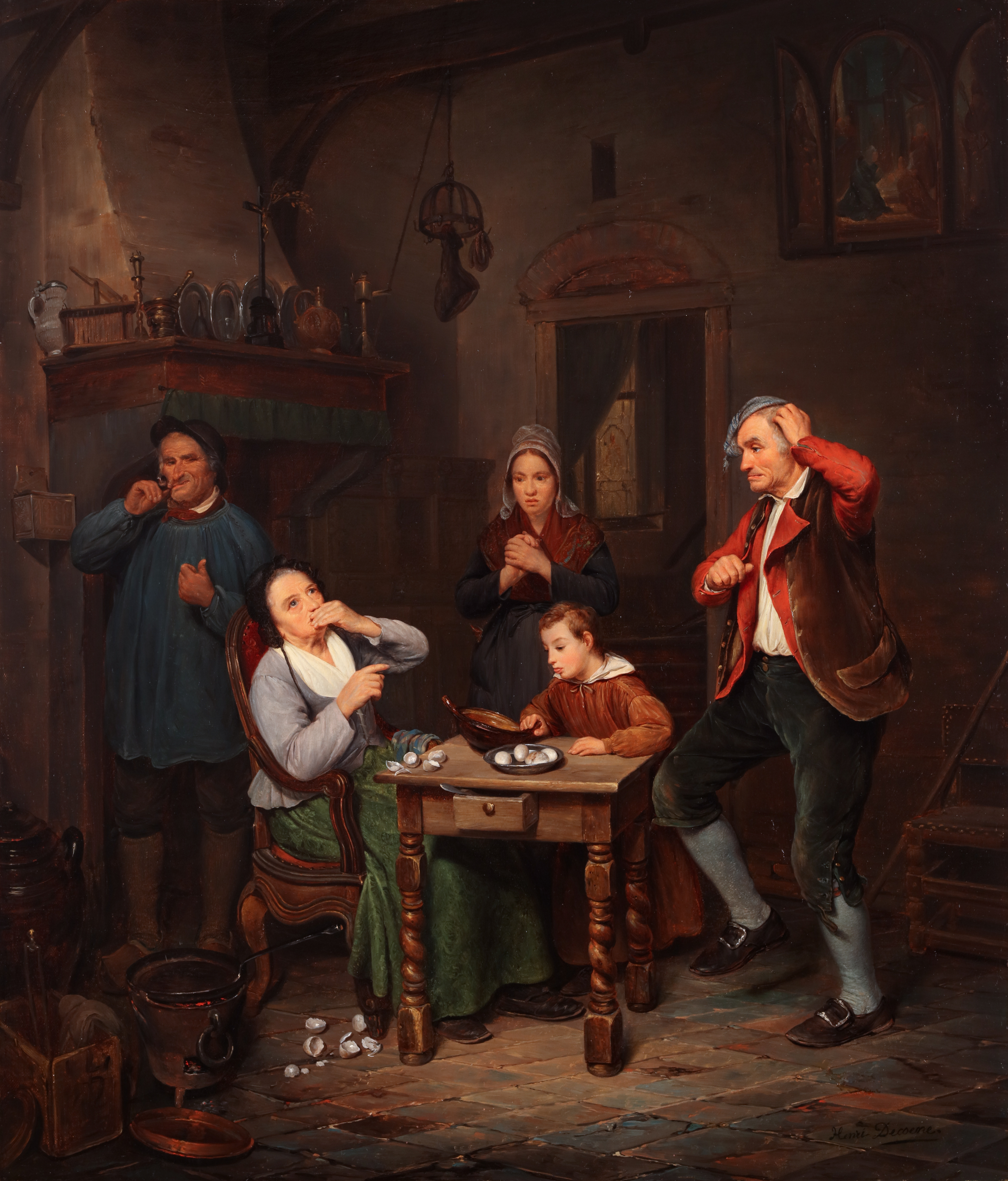
The empty Eggshells
