= Nederbrakel =

- Town
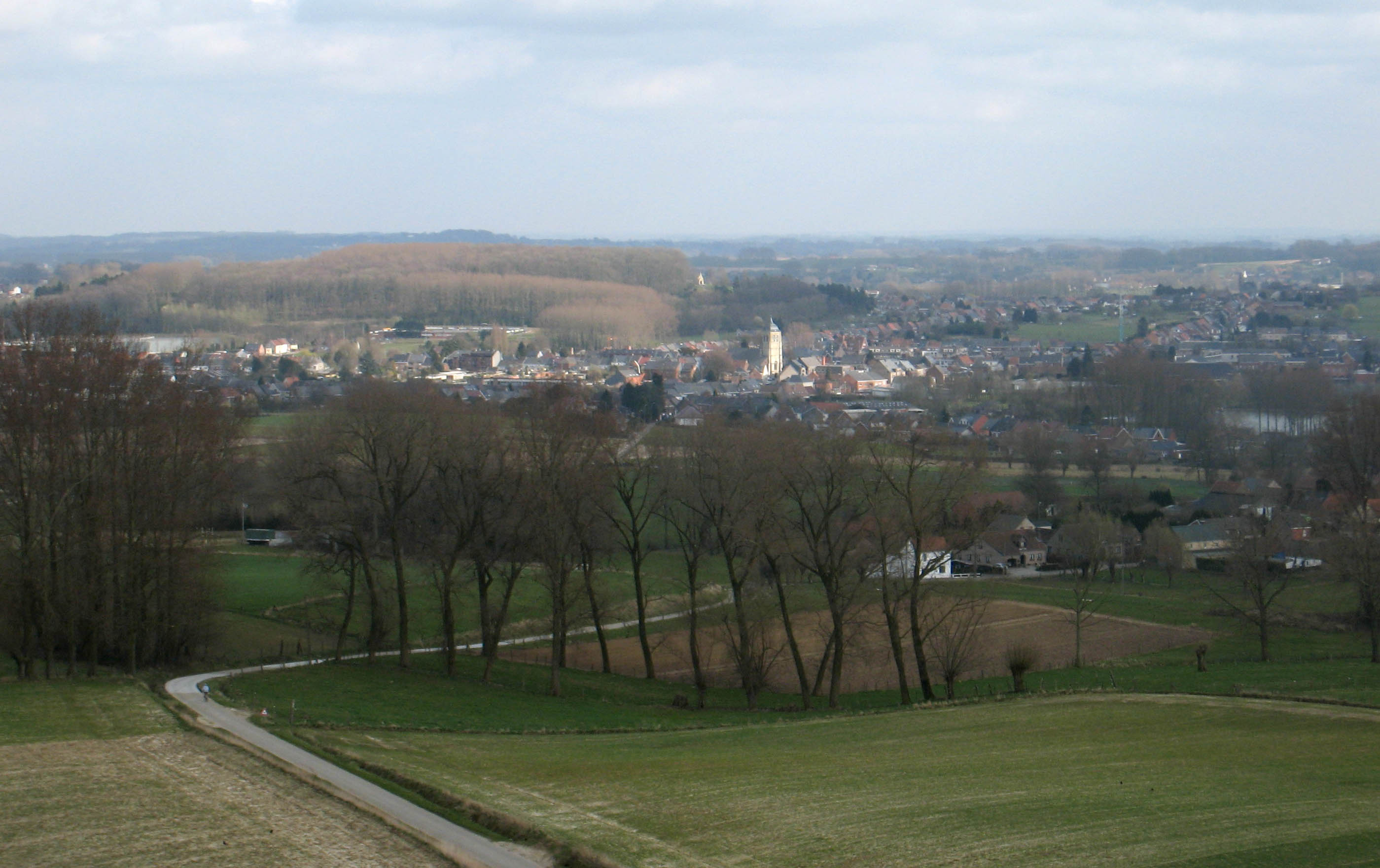
- View of Nederbrakel from the Uitkijktoren (Watch Tower)

- Location in Belgium
- Coordinates: 50.8028°N 3.7641°E
- Country: Belgium
- Region: Flemish Region
- Province: East Flanders
- Municipality: Brakel

Area
  - Total: 8.76 km^{2} (3.38 sq mi)

Population (2021)
  - Total: 6,454
  - Density: 737/km^{2} (1,910/sq mi)
- Time zone: CET

Nederbrakel is a town in the municipality of Brakel. It is located in the Denderstreek and the Flemish Ardennes, the hilly southern part of the province of East Flanders, Belgium. With 5,972 residents as of 2000, it forms the largest individual part of the municipality. Nederbrakel is located near the language border.

== Overview ==
Ceramics have been discovered dating from 450 B.C. The town was first mentioned as Brakele Inferius in the 13th century. In the 19th century, the economy was mainly based on flax cultivation. The Railway line Aalst-Zottegem-Ronse opened in 1885 with a train station at Nederbrakel which closed in 1963.

The Sint-Pietersbanden Church was built in the 14th century, and reconstructed in 1828. The tower was built next to the church between 1515 and 1521. The spire burnt down in 1750 and was replaced with a simple spire. The tower was classified as a monument in 1936.

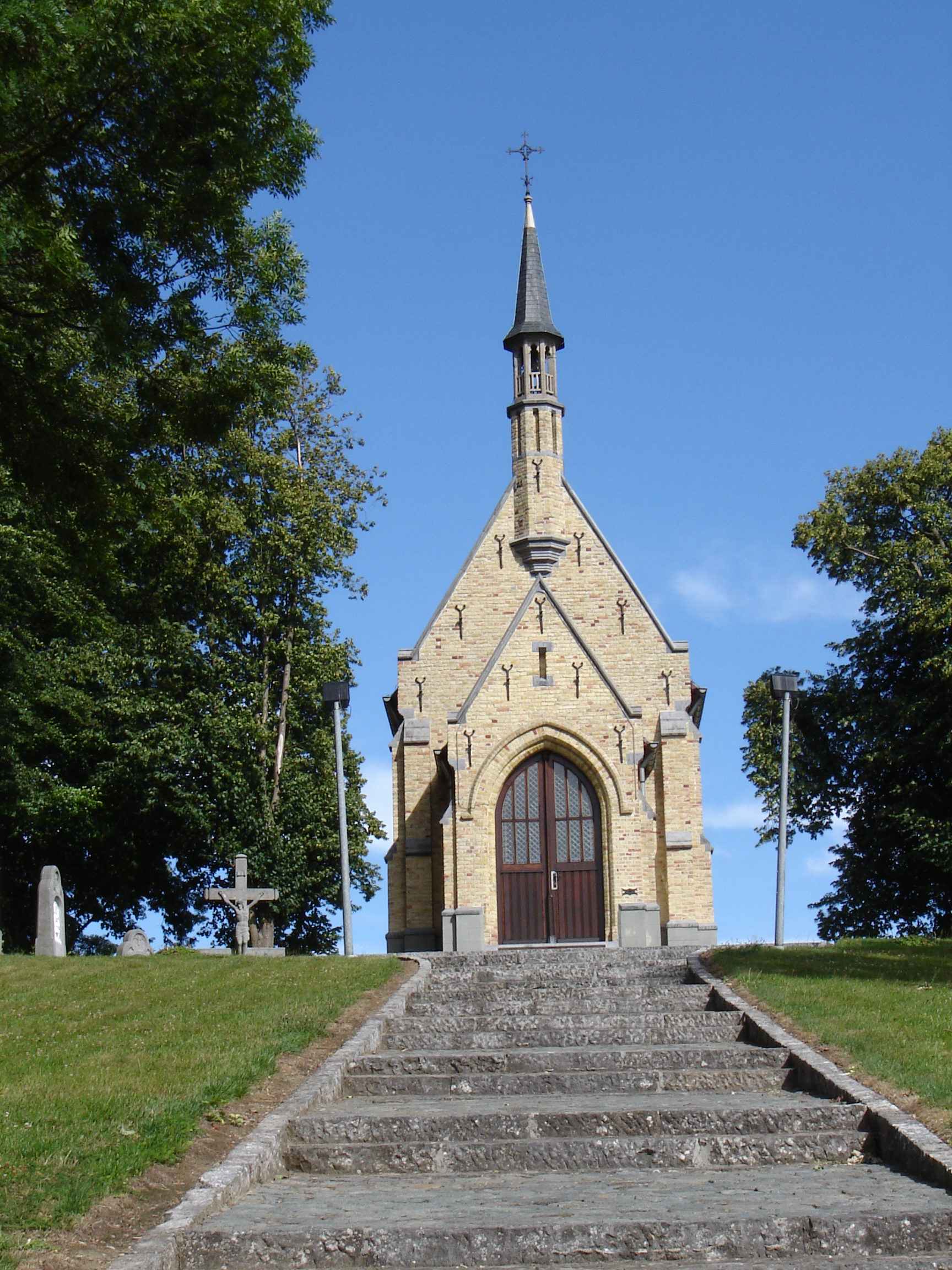
Toep Chapel

In 1917, Dean August Vael prayed that the town would be spared in World War I. In 1924, the Toep Chapel was erected to commemorate the sparing of Nederbakel.

The Toep Hill is one of the two hills next to the village. The Toep Park is located on top of the hill. This privately owned park contains the source of mineral water which has been bottled since 1898. On the edge of the park is the Castle of the Toep Sources, a neoclassic castle built in 1873.

During the 20th century, the town became a residential and commuter town. In 1971, the municipality of Nederbrakel merged with Michelbeke and Opbrakel. The new municipality was named Brakel.

== Notable people ==
- Jean Henri De Coene (1798–1866), painter
- Albert De Vleeschauwer (1897–1971), politician
