= Zegelsem =

- Village
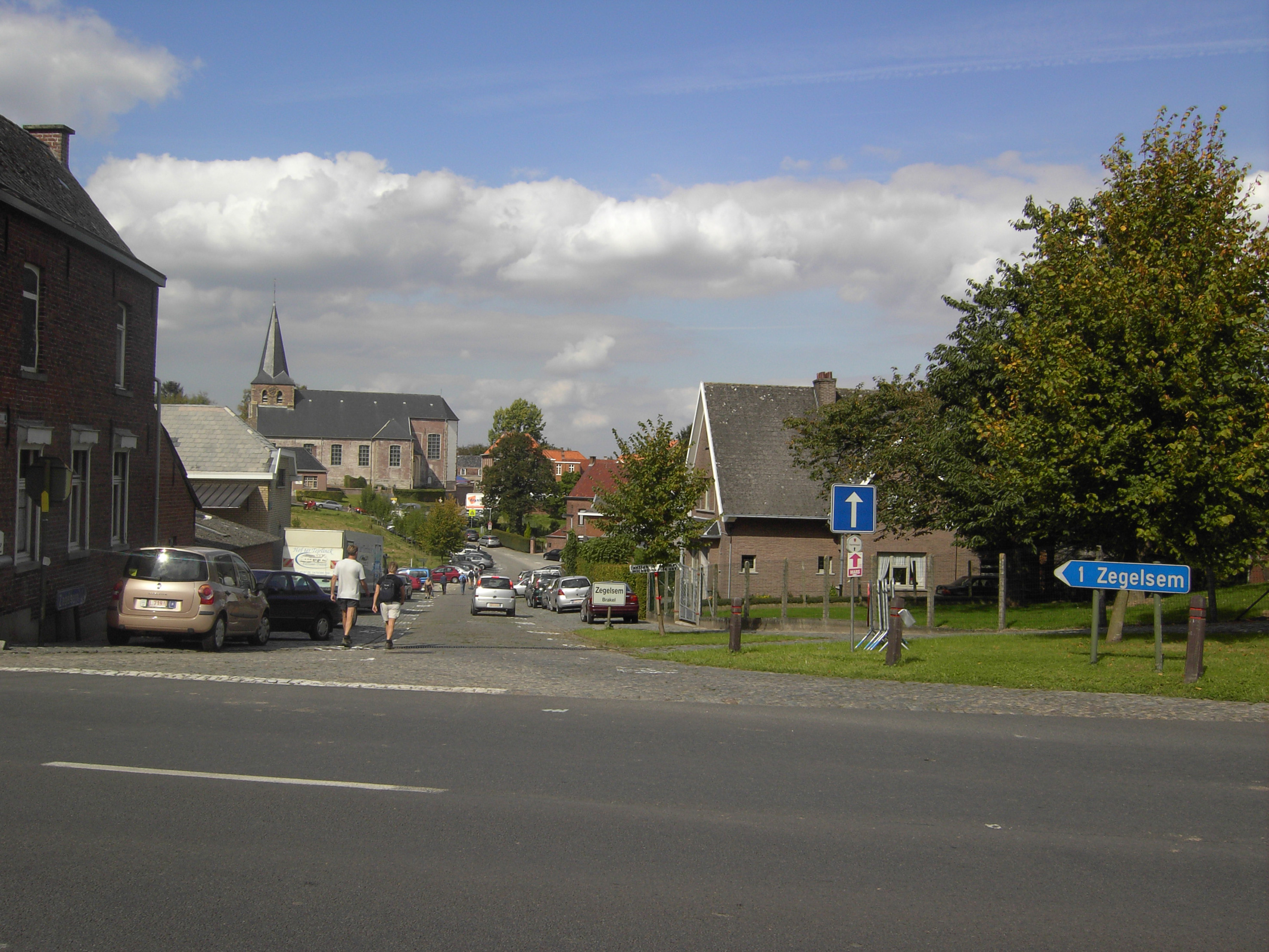
- View on Zegelsem

- Location in Belgium
- Coordinates: 50.8200°N 3.7175°E
- Country: Belgium
- Region: Flemish Region
- Province: East Flanders
- Municipality: Brakel

Area
  - Total: 9.07 km^{2} (3.50 sq mi)

Population (2022)
  - Total: 946
  - Density: 104/km^{2} (270/sq mi)
- Time zone: CET
- Website: zegelsem.be

Zegelsem is a village in the municipality of Brakel in the province of East Flanders, Belgium. Zegelsem is an agricultural community in the Flemish Ardennes. It is located about 26 kilometres (16 mi) south of Ghent.

== Overview ==
Zegelsem is a part of the hilly landscape of the Flemish Ardennes. The hills are cut by several brooks, the most important being the Perlinkbeek. The village was first mentioned in 866 as "Sigulfi villa", and means "settlement of Sigiwulf (person)". The settlement used to be property of the Lobbes Abbey. Around 881, the village and church were destroyed by the Vikings. The parish church which was later built, was dedicated to Ursmar, the first abbot of the Lobbes Abbey.

Zegelsem is known for its street paved with sett and is nicknamed kasseidorp (sett village). As a result, it is featured in road cycling races like the Tour of Flanders. In the late 20th century, many streets were repaved. Between 1998 and 1999, all the streets in the village were renewed and relaid with sett stones.

Zegelsem was an independent municipality until 1971, when it was merged into Brakel.

== Buildings ==
The St Ursmarus Church is a three aisled neoclass church from 1783. The tower was built around 1525, but contains 13th century elements. The church has an organ built in 1753 by Lambert Van Peteghem, and a rood screen in Louis XIV style.

== Notable people ==
- Herman Teirlinck (1879–1967), author. Born in Sint-Jans-Molenbeek, but spent most of his life in Zegelsem.
- Isidoor Teirlinck (1851–1934), author.

== Gallery ==
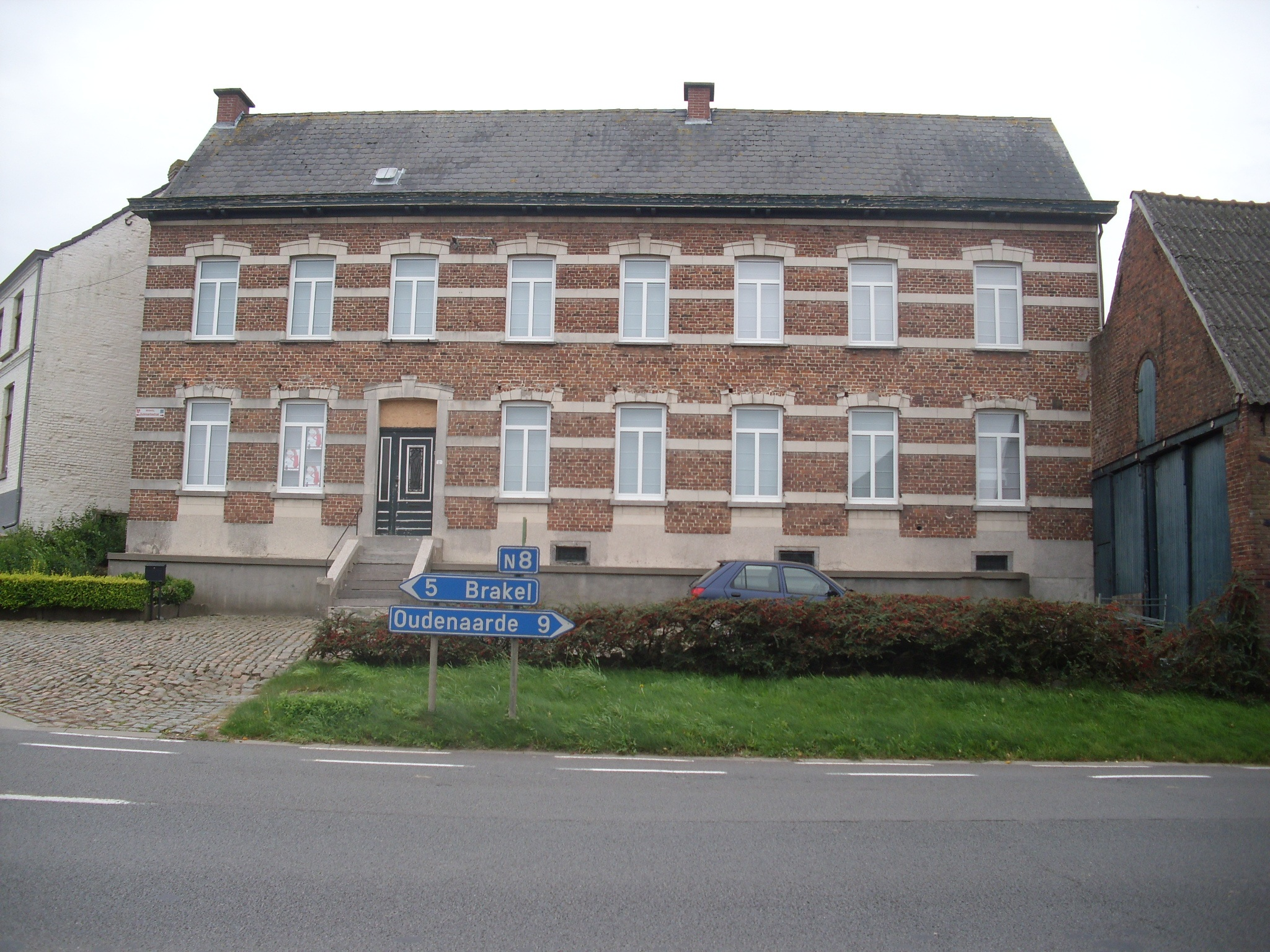
House in Zegelsem

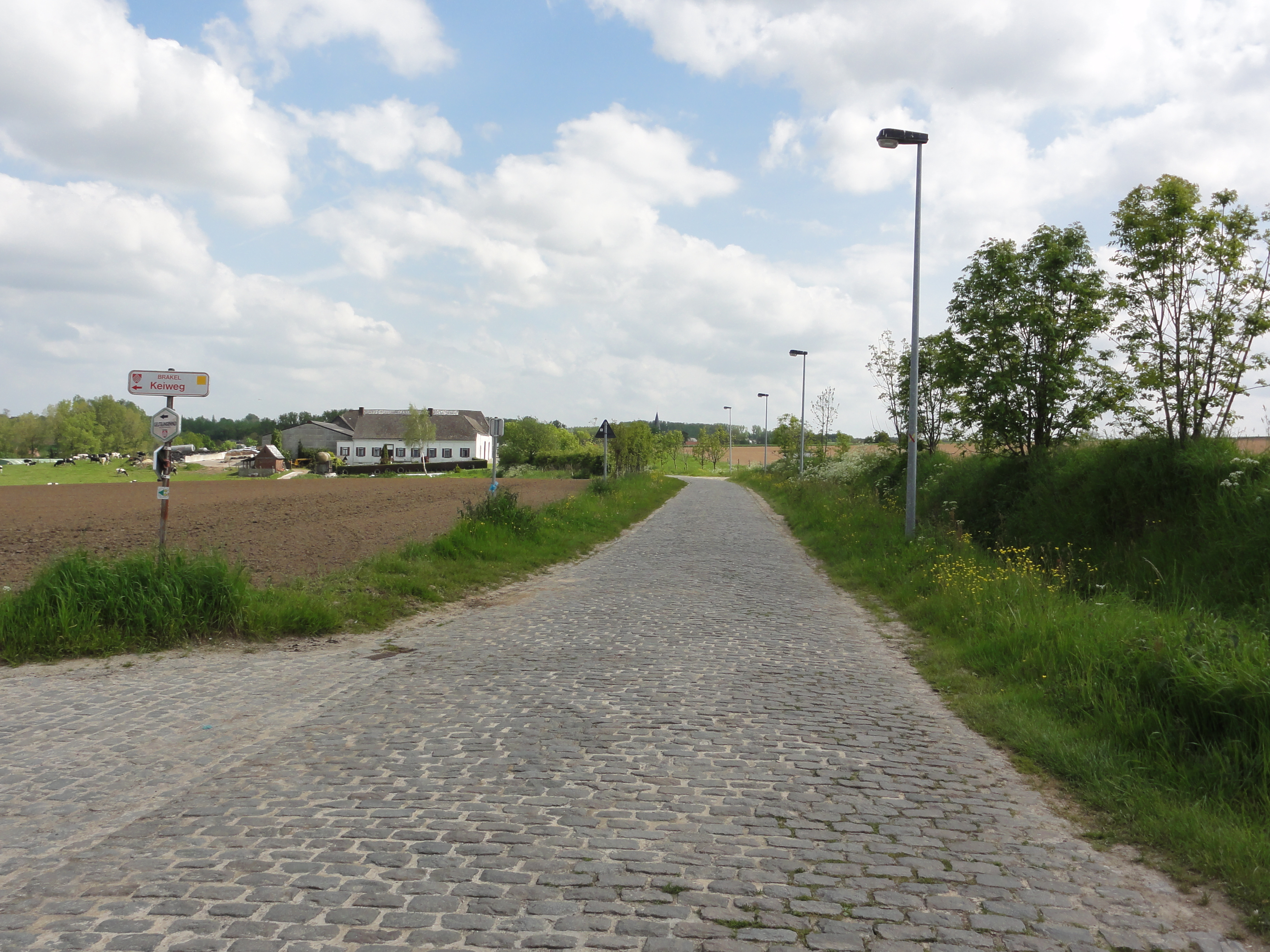
Sett street in Zegelsem

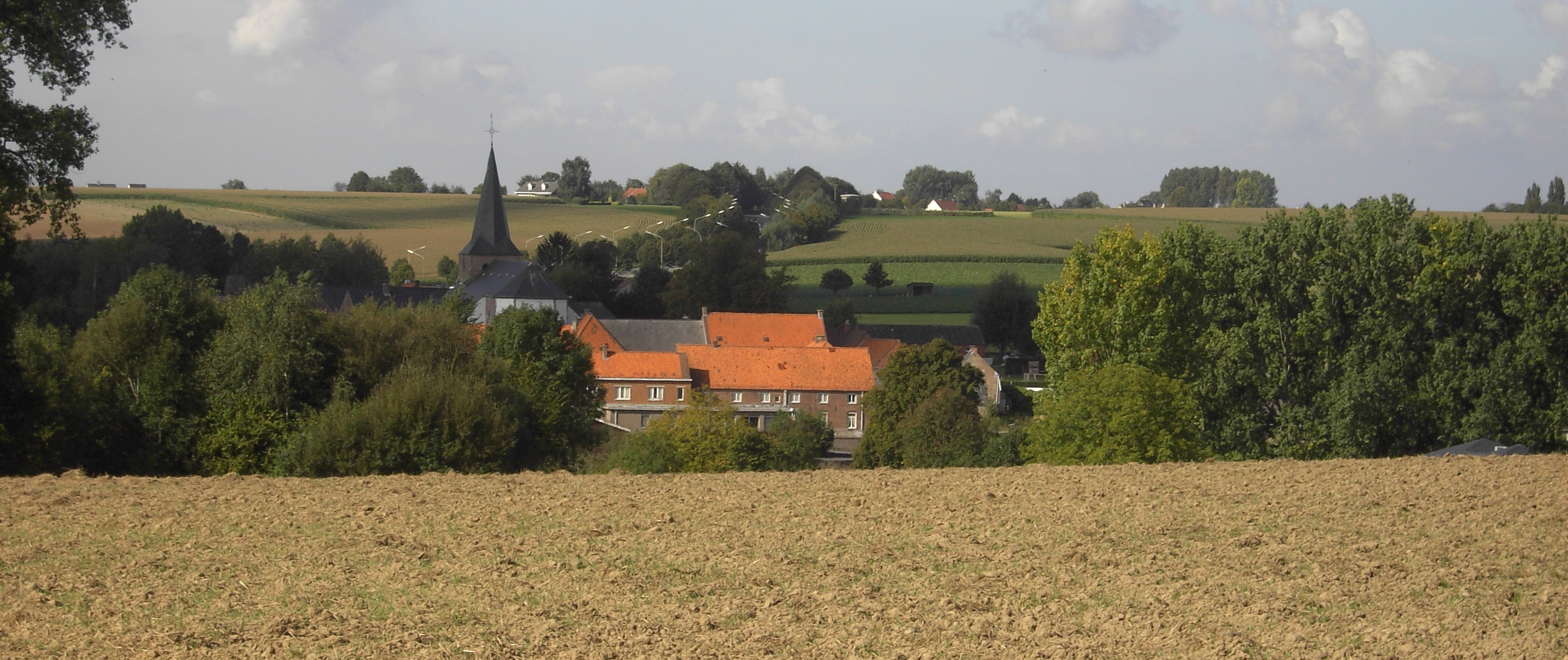
View on Zegelsem

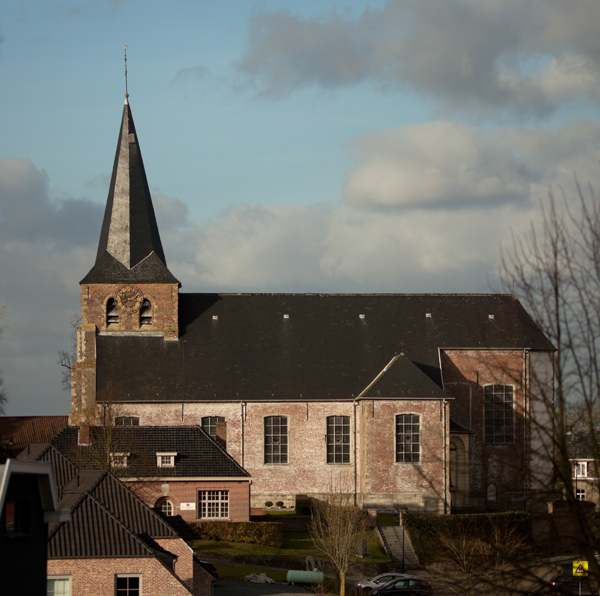
St Ursmarus Church
