= Sint-Maria-Oudenhove =

- Village
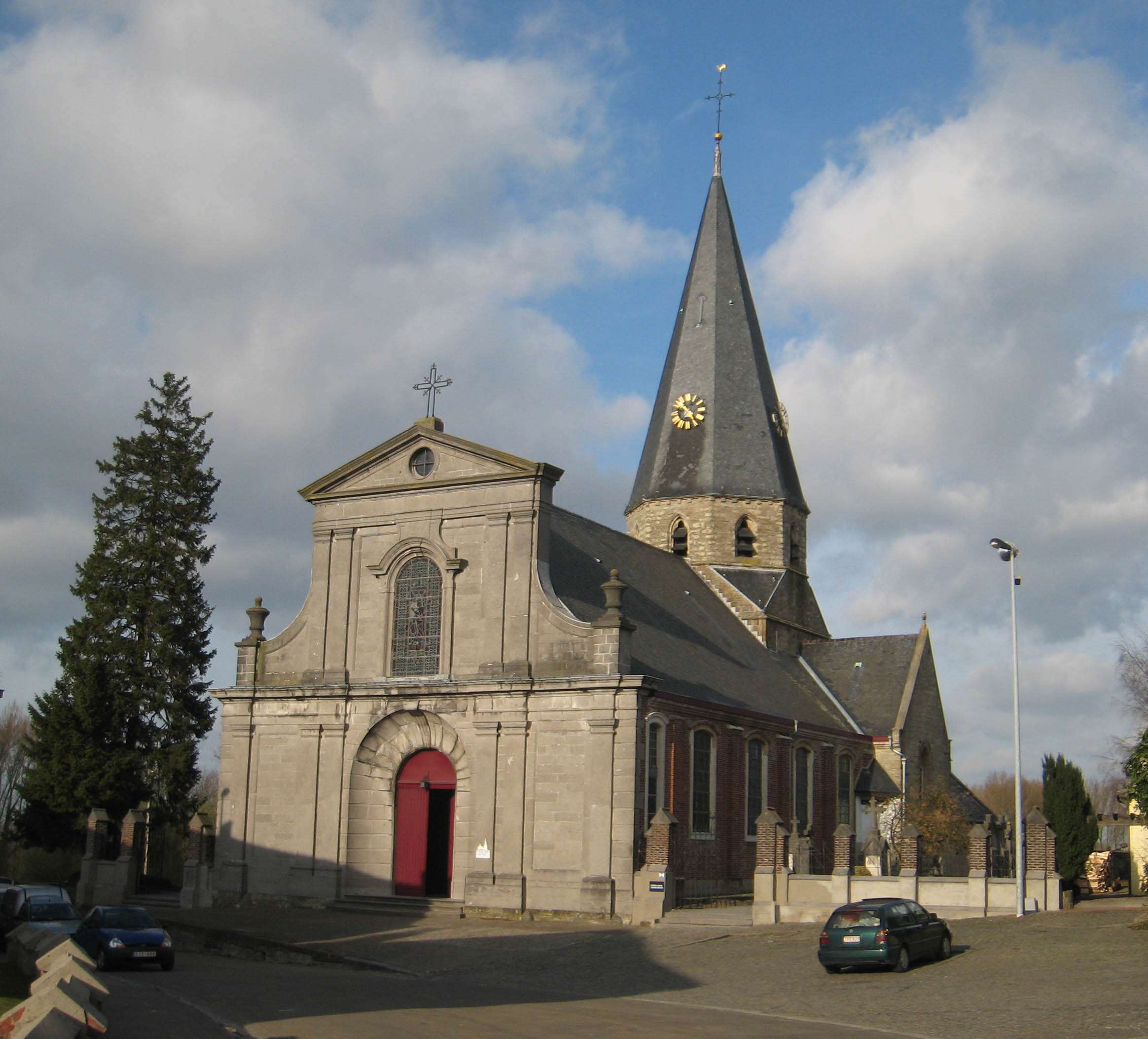
- Church of Sint-Maria-Oudenhove (2009)

- Location in Belgium
- Coordinates: 50.833°N 3.796°E
- Country: Belgium
- Region: Flemish Region
- Province: East Flanders
- Municipality: Zottegem; Brakel

Area
  - Total: 5.27 km^{2} (2.03 sq mi)

Population (2021)
  - Total: 2,501
  - Density: 475/km^{2} (1,230/sq mi)
- Time zone: CET

Sint-Maria-Oudenhove is a village in the Denderstreek and in the Flemish Ardennes, the hilly southern part of the province of East Flanders, Belgium.

It was formerly an independent municipality. In 1977 the main part of the settlement became part of the municipality of Zottegem, with a smaller section joining the municipality of Brakel.

== History ==
From the middle of the 12th century, Sint-Maria-Oudenhove was part of the Land of Aalst in loan by the Lords of Zotegem. In 1675, it became a barony.

The Castle of Lilare is located near the River Zwalm. The original castle was plundered and set on fire by the troops of Louis XIV during the War of Devolution in 1667. The castle was rebuilt in the late 17th century. In 1933, the castle was bought by the sisters of Saint Francis of Opbrakel and turned into a girl boarding school. The castle is still in use as a school.

During the 20th century, Sint-Maria-Oudenhove became mainly a commuter's community. In 1977, most of the municipality merged into Zottegem with a small area awarded to Brakel. The municipality was home to 2,971 people and covered an area of 8.91 square kilometres (3.44 sq mi).

== Gallery ==
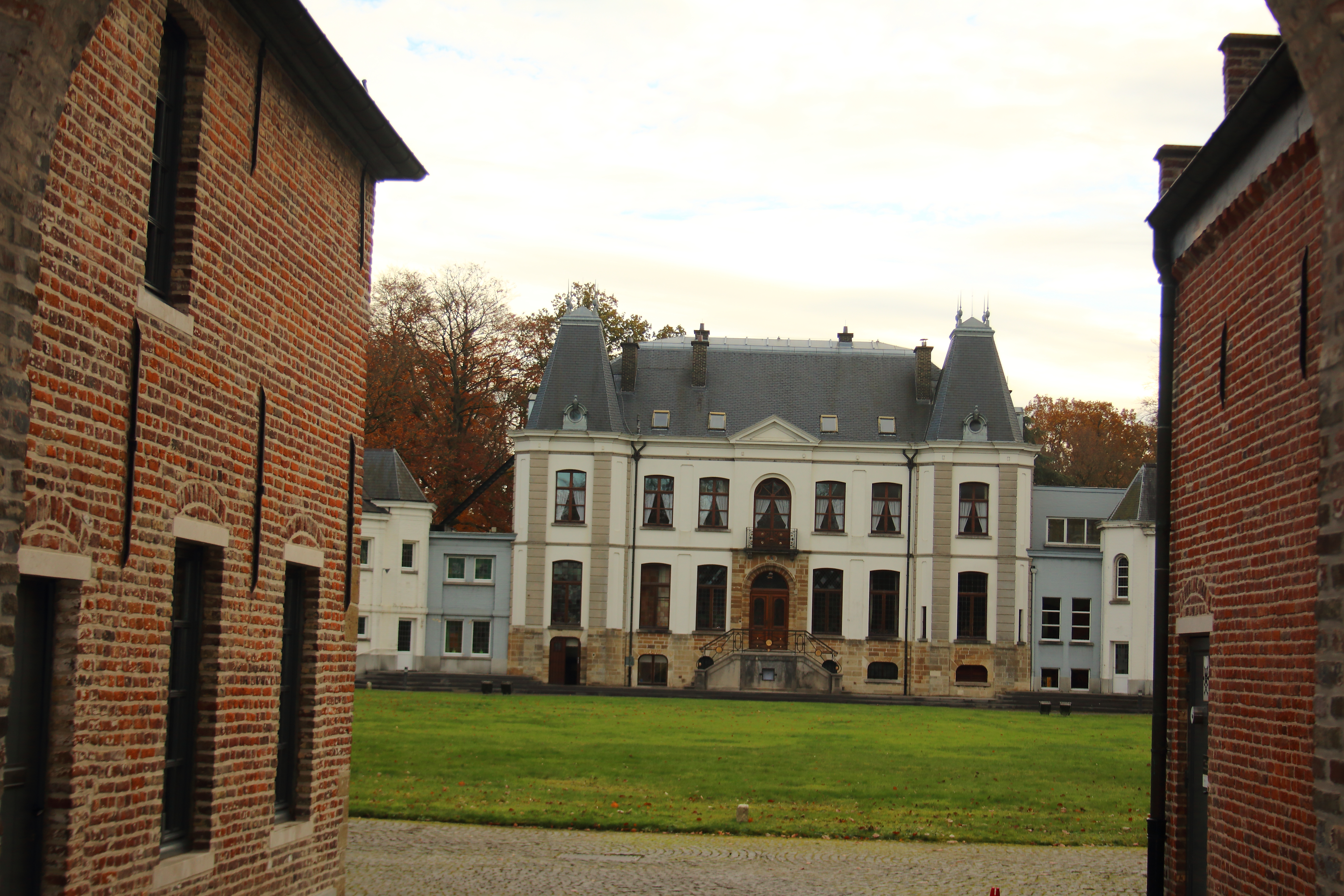
The Castle of Lilare

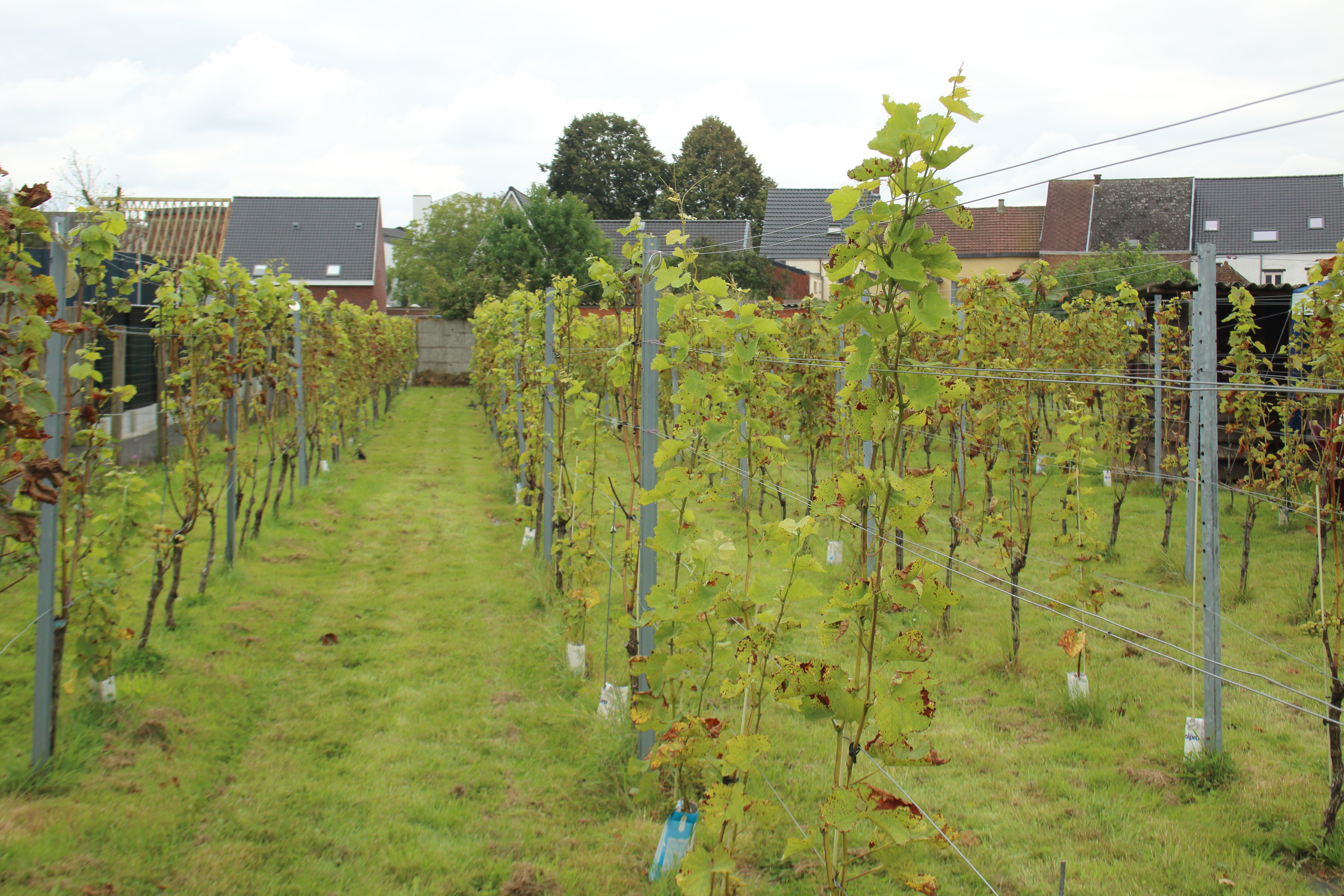
Vineyard

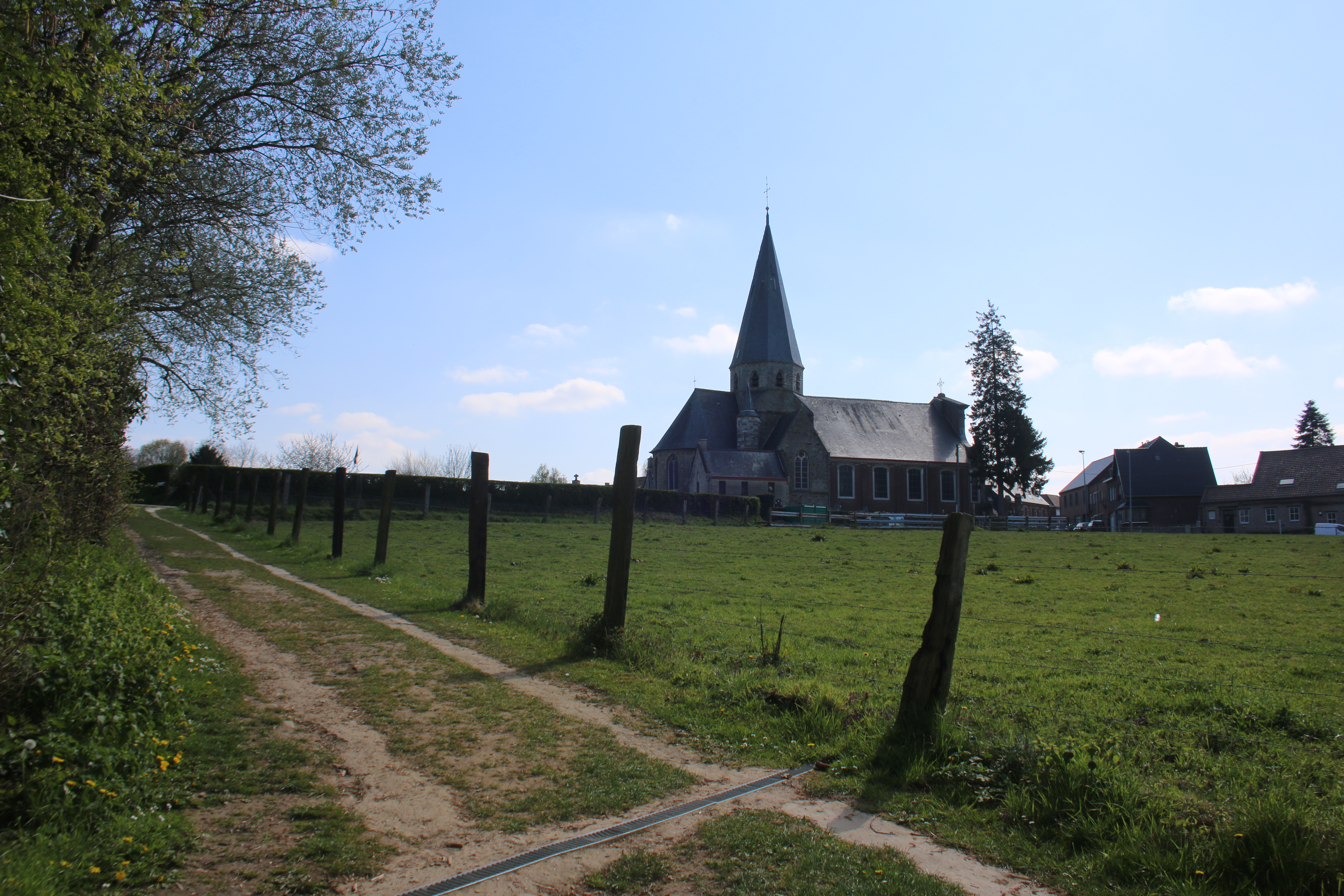
View on the church

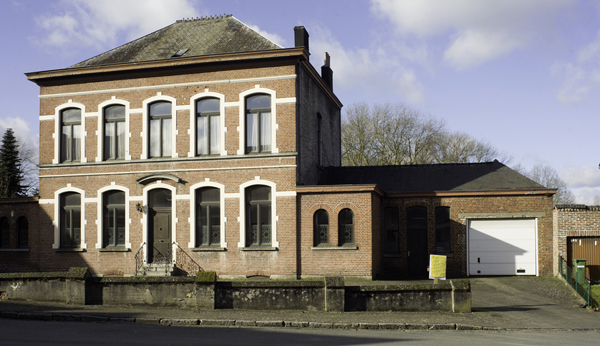
House in Sint-Maria-Oudenhove
