= Brakel, Belgium =

Municipality in the Belgian province of East Flanders

Brakel
- Municipality
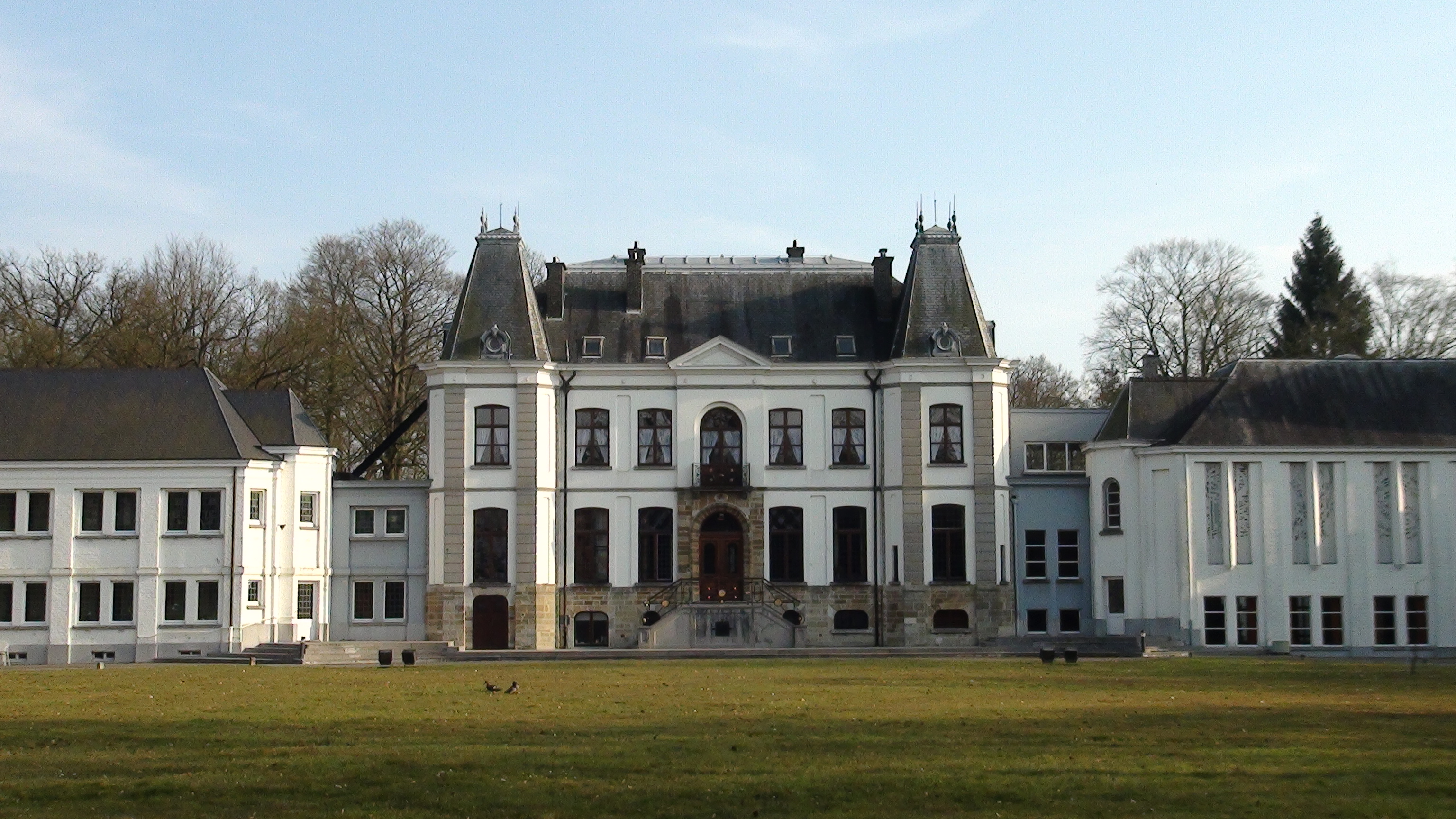
- Lilare Castle in St-Maria-Oudenhove

- Flag Coat of arms

- Location of Brakel in East Flanders
- Interactive map of Brakel
- Location in Belgium
- Coordinates: 50°48′N 03°45′E
- Country: Belgium
- Community: Flemish Community
- Region: Flemish Region
- Province: East Flanders
- Arrondissement: Oudenaarde

Government
  - Mayor: Stefaan De Vleeschouwer (Open VLD )
  - Governing party: Open VLD

Area
  - Total: 56.96 km^{2} (21.99 sq mi)

Population (2018-01-01)
  - Total: 14,781
  - Density: 259.5/km^{2} (672.1/sq mi)
- Postal codes: 9660, 9661
- NIS code: 45059
- Area codes: 055
- Website: www.brakel.be

Brakel (Dutch pronunciation: [ˈbraːkəl]) is a municipality in the Belgian province of East Flanders in the Denderstreek and the Flemish Ardennes. The name is derived from a Carolingian villa Braglo first mentioned in 866 and located in the center of Opbrakel. Since 1970, the municipality has comprised the villages of Nederbrakel, Opbrakel, Michelbeke, Elst, Zegelsem. In 1977 Everbeek, Parike and part of Sint-Maria-Oudenhove were added. On 1 January 2018, Brakel had a population of 14,781. The area is 56.46 km² which gives a population density of 262 per km². The mayor is Alexander De Croo.

The region is known for the green hills and valleys, which attract cyclists and walkers and play a role in the Tour of Flanders cycling race.

The Braekel chicken is named after the town.

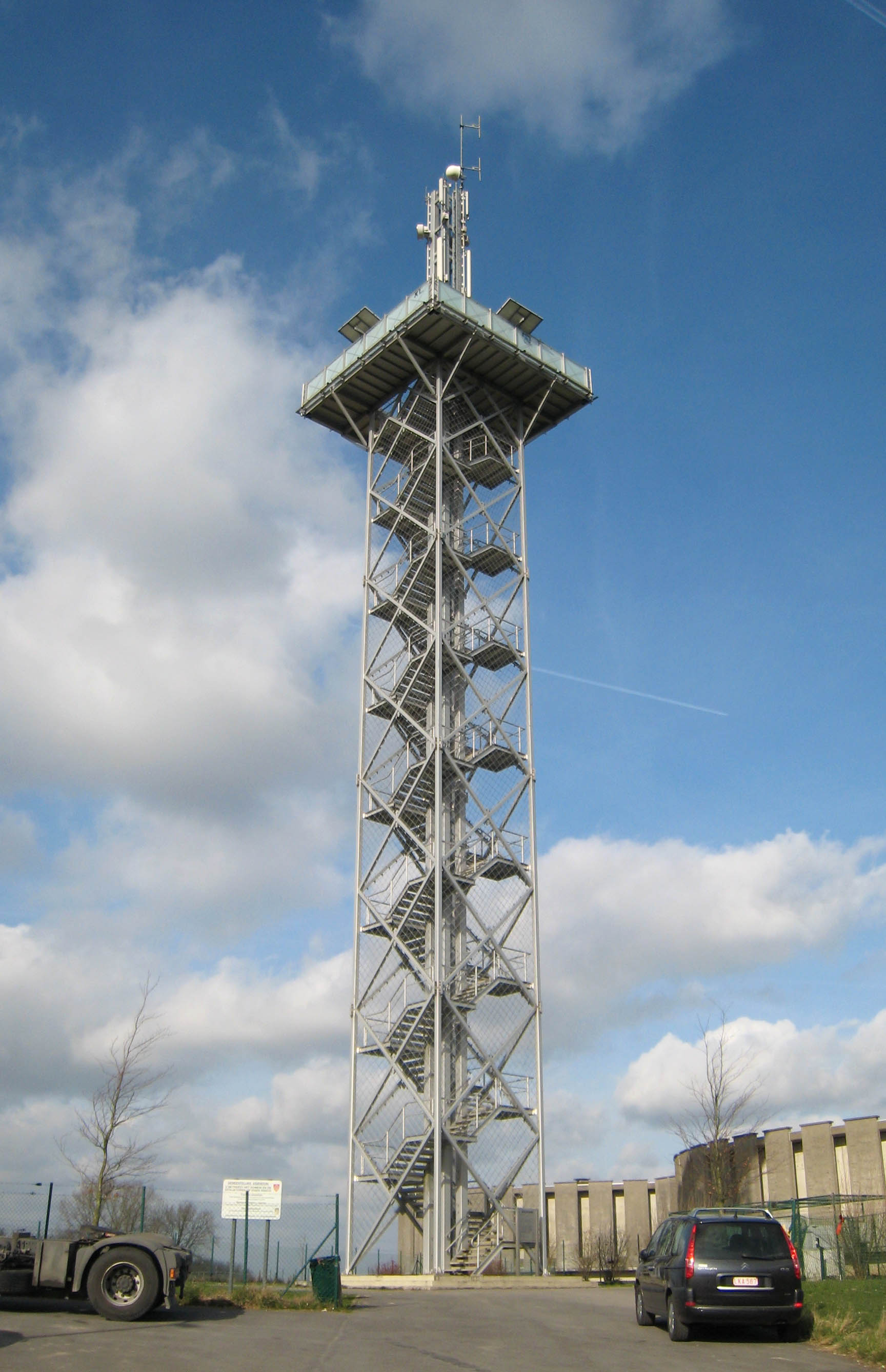
The Uitkijktoren

The Uitkijktoren, a 32 metres (105 ft) high viewing tower was opened in April 2001. It is located at 50.8124°N 3.7391°E on the Twaalfbunderstraat, north-west of Nederbrakel. Orientation boards at the top enable visitors to identify places of interest in all directions.

== Famous inhabitants ==
- Alexander De Croo, politician, Prime Minister of Belgium since 2020
- Herman De Croo, politician, former president of the Chamber of Representatives of Belgium
- Robbie McEwen, cyclist, won 12 stages in the Tour de France
- Peter van Petegem, cyclist, won Paris–Roubaix and the Tour of Flanders

== See also ==
- Zwalm (River)
