= Michelbeke =

- Village
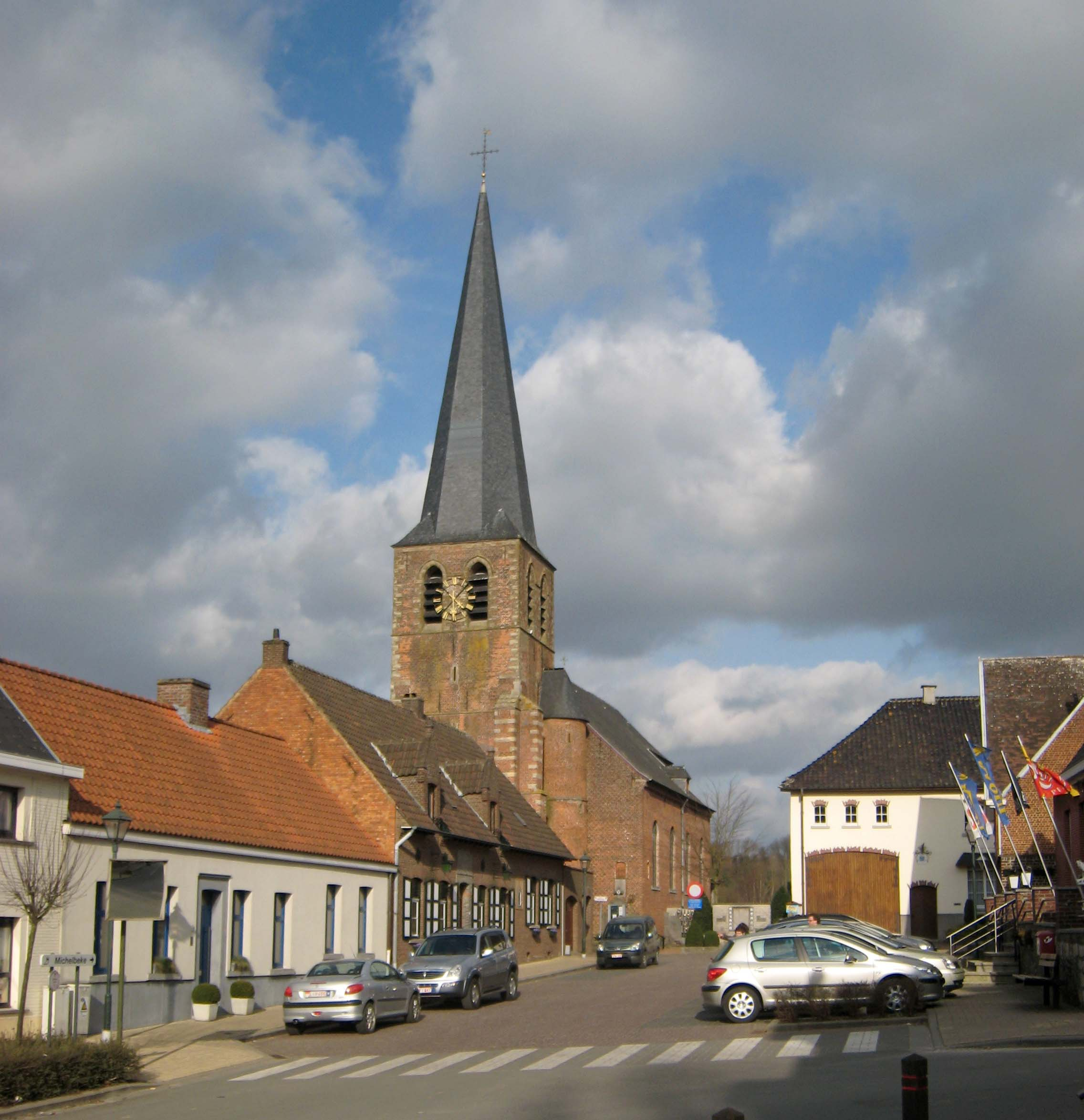
- Michelbeke church

- Location in Belgium
- Coordinates: 50.833°N 3.7635°E
- Country: Belgium
- Region: Flemish Region
- Province: East Flanders
- Municipality: Brakel

Area
  - Total: 4.10 km^{2} (1.58 sq mi)

Population (2021)
  - Total: 1,156
  - Density: 282/km^{2} (730/sq mi)
- Time zone: CET

Michelbeke is a village in the municipality of Brakel, Belgium. It is located in the Denderstreek and in the Flemish Ardennes, the hilly southern part of the province of East Flanders, Belgium. It was itself a municipality until the fusion of the municipalities on 1 January 1971.

== History ==
Michelbeke has been inhabited since the Roman period. A Roman villa and bath house have been discovered during the construction of the Kammeland estate. The village was first mentioned in 1150s and is a toponym for mud brook. Railway line Aalst-Zottegem-Ronse opened in 1885 with a train station at Michelbeke which closed in 1963. The municipality merged into Brakel in 1971.

== Sports ==
Women's volleyball club Richa Michelbeke plays at the highest level of the Belgian league pyramid.

== Gallery ==
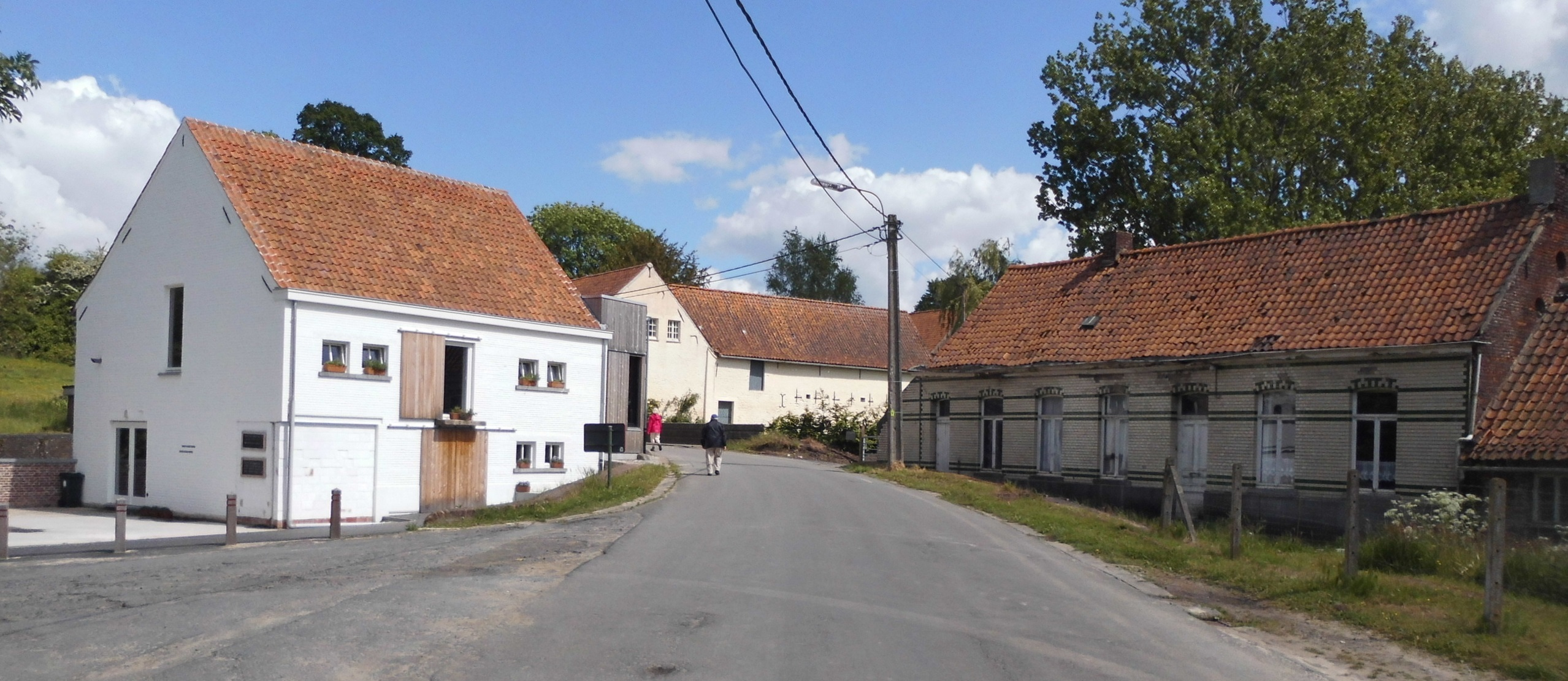
Miller's house

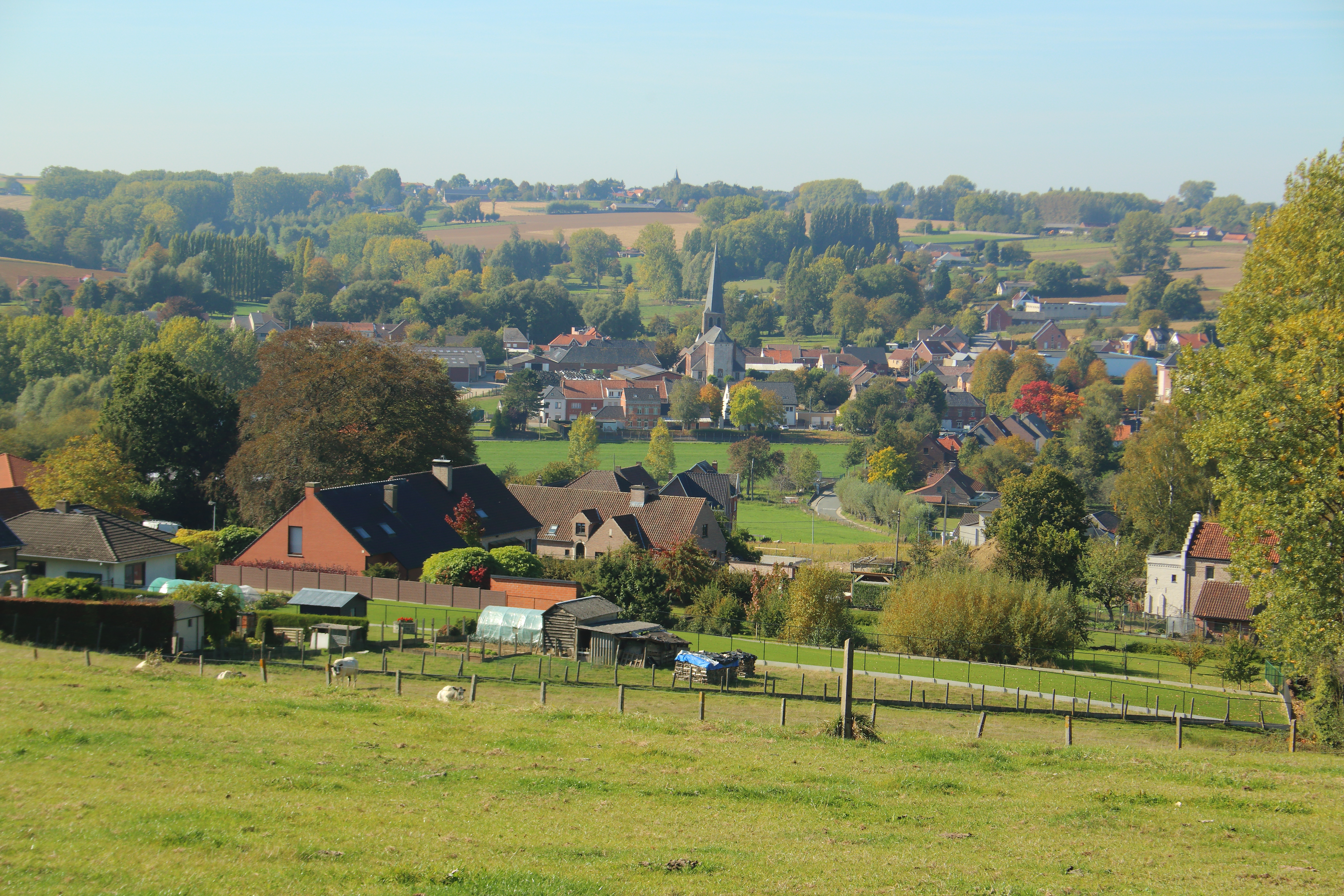
View on Michelbeke
