= Tour of Flanders =

The Tour of Flanders (Dutch: Ronde van Vlaanderen) may refer to the following cycle races:

- Tour of Flanders (men's race), a professional men's cycling race
- Tour of Flanders (women's race), a professional women's cycling race
- Tour of Flanders U23, for under-23 riders
