= Sint-Maria-Lierde =

- Village
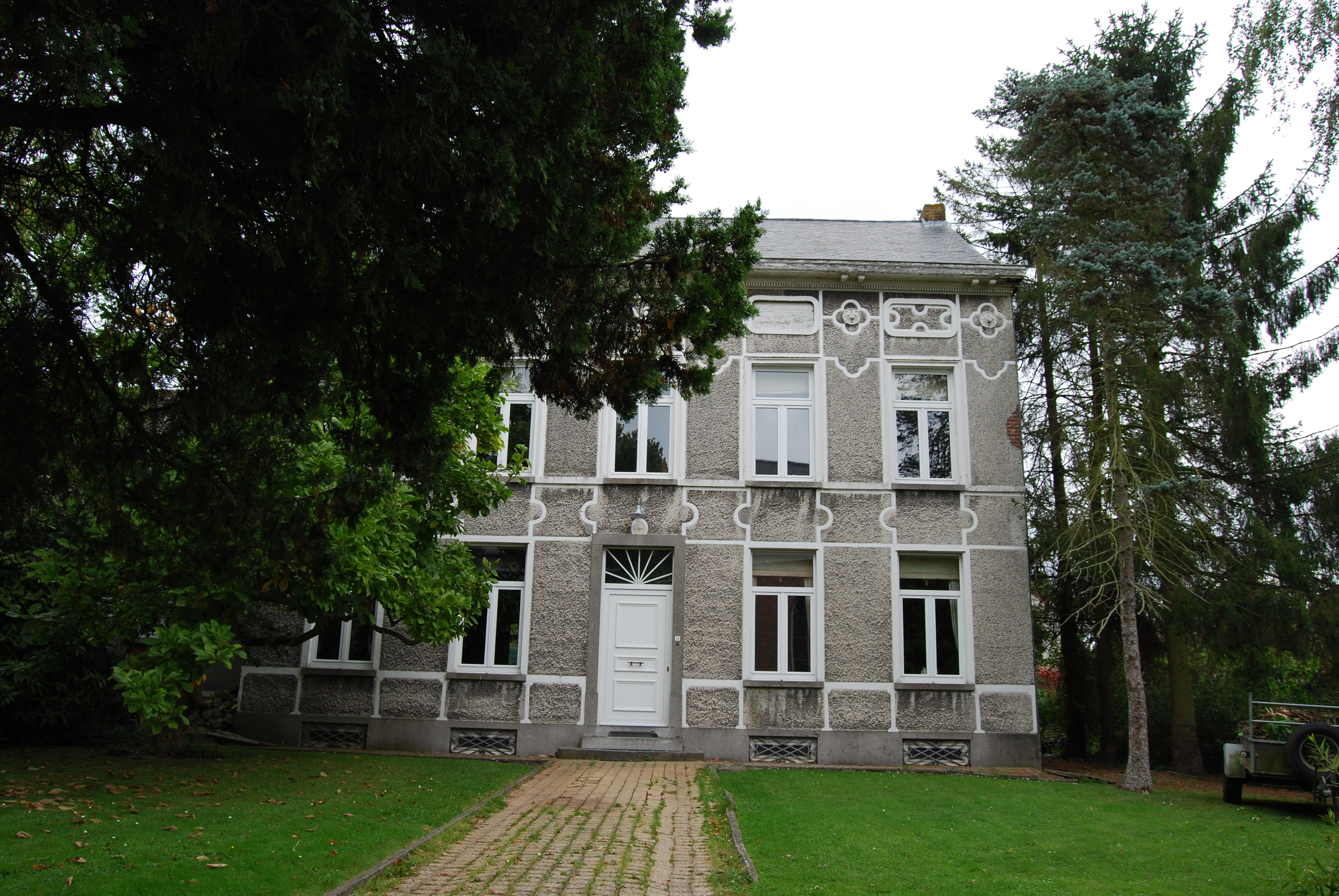
- Residential home in Sint-Maria-Lierde

- Seal

- Location in Belgium
- Coordinates: 50.82110°N 3.84635°E
- Country: Belgium
- Region: Flemish Region
- Province: East Flanders
- Municipality: Lierde

Area
  - Total: 8.97 km^{2} (3.46 sq mi)

Population (2021)
  - Total: 2,553
  - Density: 285/km^{2} (737/sq mi)
- Time zone: CET

Sint-Maria-Lierde is a village which makes up part of the municipality of Lierde. It is located in the Denderstreek and in the Flemish Ardennes, the hilly southern part of the Belgian province of East Flanders.

== Overview ==
The village was first mentioned as Lirda Sancte Marie in the late 12th century. Sint-Maria-Lierde was a small agricultural village situated in the north-east of the municipality. In 1840, a road nowadays known as N8 was constructed to the south. In 1867, the railway line Ghent–Geraardsbergen was constructed with a train station near the intersection with the road. The area around the train station started to develop, and was named Lierde after the station. In the 20th century, the village became mainly residential with a large proportion of commuters.

In 1977, the municipalities Deftinge, Hemelveerdegem, Sint-Maria-Lierde and Sint-Martens-Lierde were merged into Lierde.

The village's coat of arms shows a heart of Jesus beneath a crown. The arms were granted in 1818 and confirmed on 20 December 1840.

== Gallery ==
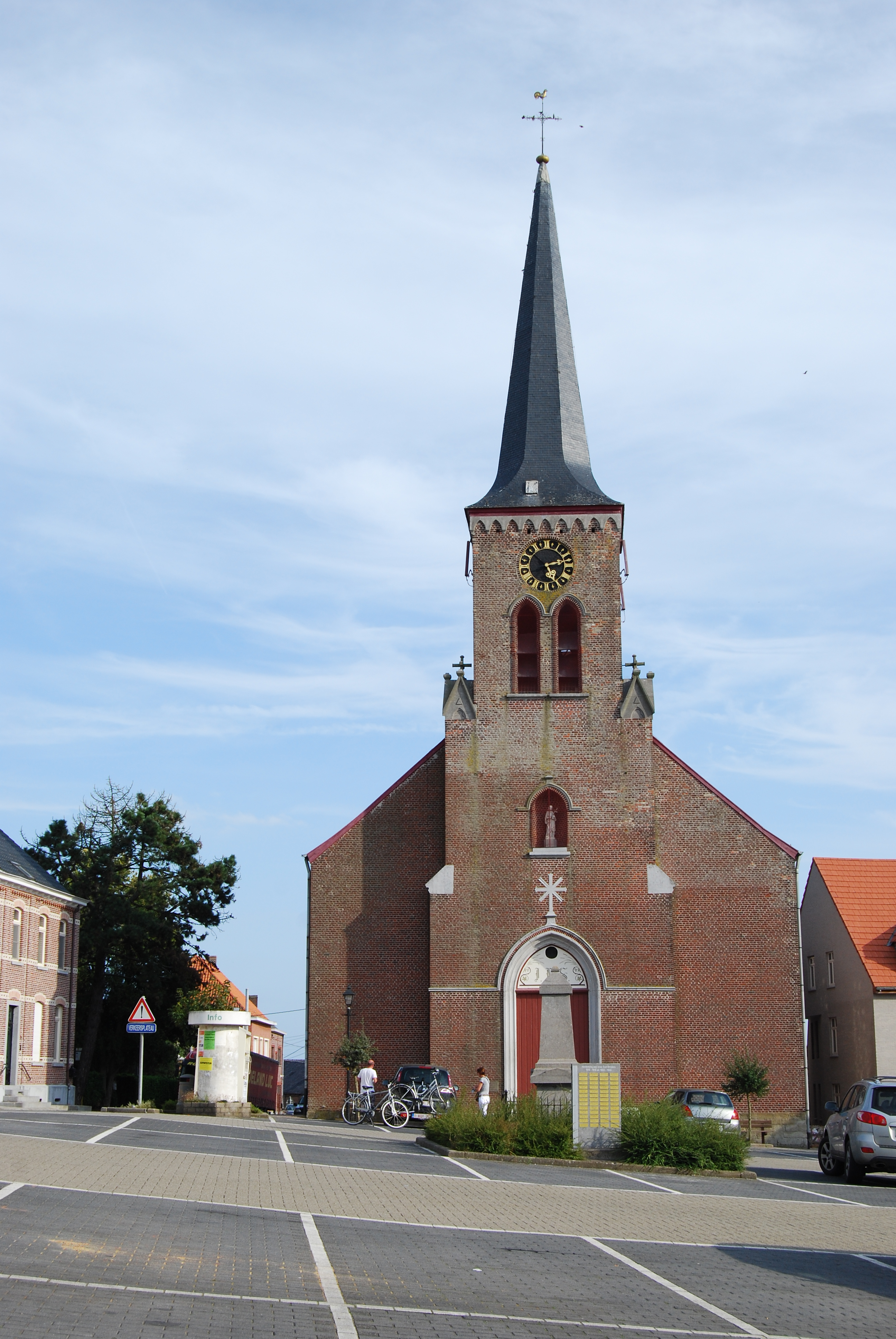
St Maria Magdalena Church

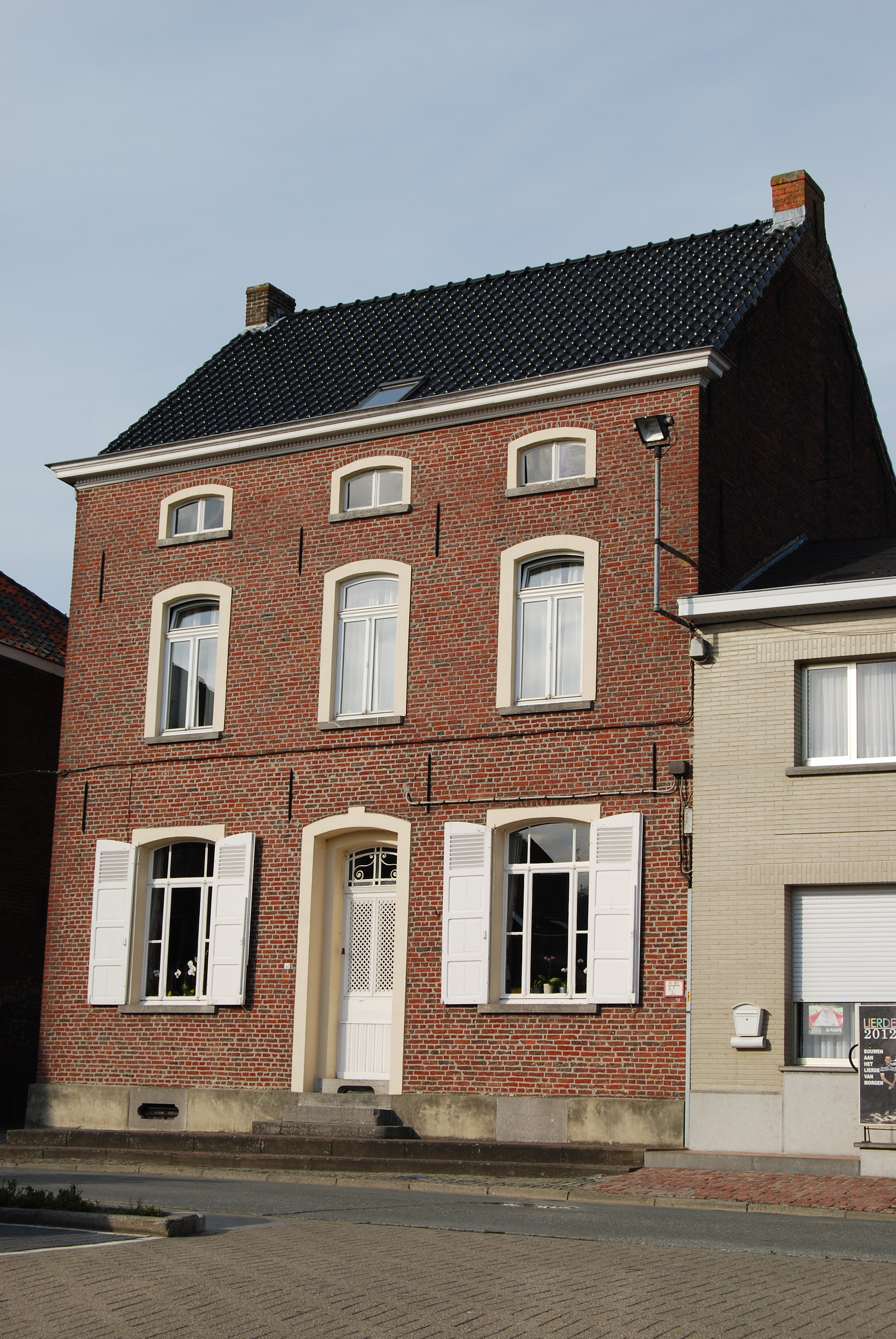
House in St Maria Lierde

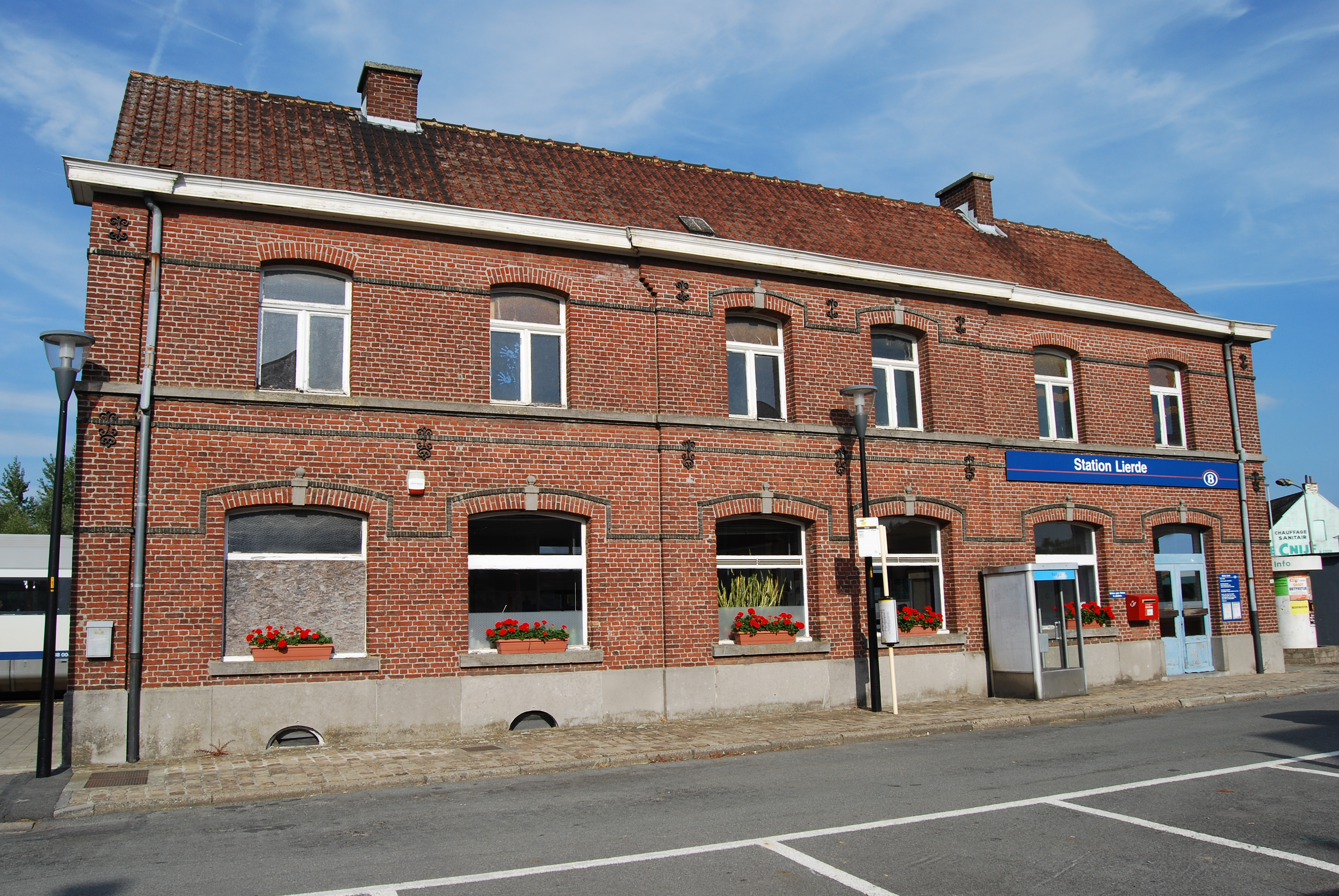
Railway station

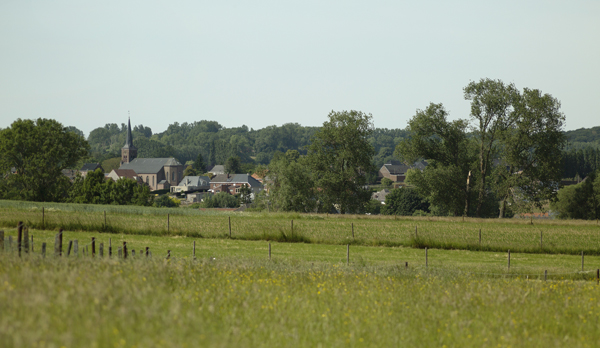
View on Sint-Maria-Lierde
