= Lierde =

Municipality in the Belgian province of East Flanders

- Municipality
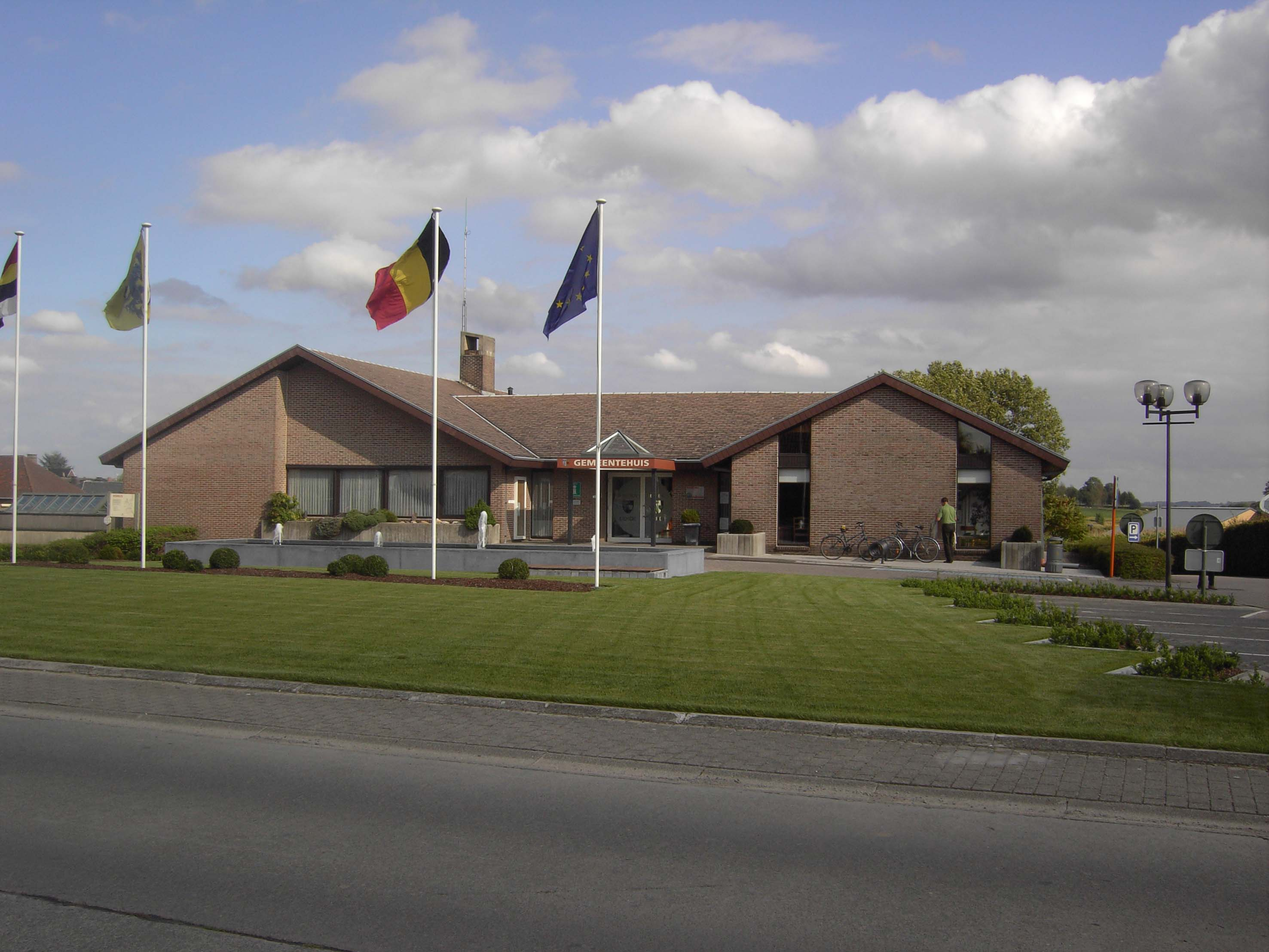
- Lierde town hall

- Flag Coat of arms

- Location of Lierde in East Flanders
- Interactive map of Lierde
- Location in Belgium
- Coordinates: 50°48′N 03°49′E
- Country: Belgium
- Community: Flemish Community
- Region: Flemish Region
- Province: East Flanders
- Arrondissement: Oudenaarde

Government
  - Mayor: Jurgen Soetens (Voor Lierde)
  - Governing parties: Voor Lierde, De 3de partij

Area
  - Total: 26.32 km^{2} (10.16 sq mi)

Population (2018-01-01)
  - Total: 6,567
  - Density: 249.5/km^{2} (646.2/sq mi)
- Postal codes: 9570-9571-9572
- NIS code: 45063
- Area codes: 055-054
- Website: www.lierde.be

Lierde (Dutch pronunciation: [ˈliːrdə]) is a municipality located in the Flemish Ardennes, the hilly southern part of the Belgian province of East Flanders in the Denderstreek. The municipality comprises the towns of Deftinge, Hemelveerdegem, Sint-Maria-Lierde and Sint-Martens-Lierde. In 2021, Lierde had a total population of 6,626. The total area is 26.13 km^{2}. Lierde borders to Brakel, Zottegem, Herzele and Geraardsbergen. Lierde is known for the Ronde van vlaanderen, a bike race where cyclists climb all the hills of the Flemish Ardennes.
