= Emiel Faignaert =

Belgian cyclist

- Faignaert for Groene Leeuw

Personal information
- Born: 10 March 1919 Sint-Martens-Lierde
- Died: 10 May 1980 (aged 61) Ghent

Cycling career
- Sport: Cycling
- Discipline: Road
- Role: Rider

Professional teams
- 1943: Europe-Dunlop
- 1944: Lucien Michard-Hutchinson
- 1945: Groene Leeuw
- 1946-1947: Dilecta-Wolber
- 1948: Dilecta-J.B. Louvet-Wolber
- 1949: Dilecta-Wolber
- 1950: Groene Leeuw

Major wins
- Tour of Flanders (1947)

Emiel Faignaert (10 March 1919, in Sint-Martens-Lierde – 10 May 1980, in Ghent) was a Belgian cyclist.

He was professional from 1940 to 1950. In 1943, Faignaert won Antwerp-Ghent-Antwerp. His biggest success was in 1947 when he won the Tour of Flanders. Overall, he won 27 races.

In Faignaert's home town, a monument of him was erected in 2007.

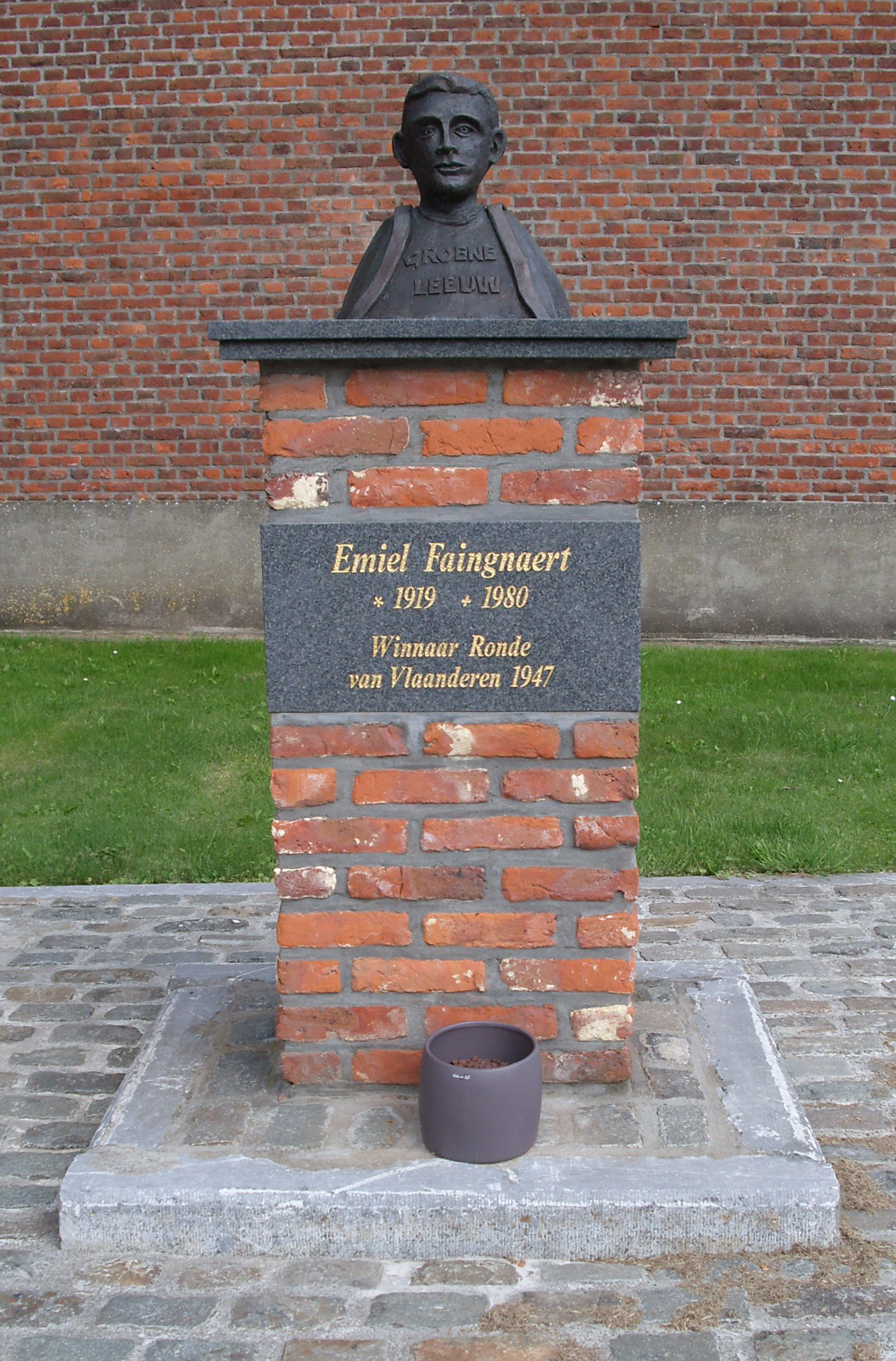
Emiel Faingnaert monument in Sint-Martens-Lierde, Belgium

== Palmarès ==
1941
3rd Scheldeprijs
5th Grote Prijs Stad Zottegem
1942
2nd Grand Prix de Wallonie
2nd Grote Prijs Stad Zottegem
1943
4th Grote Prijs Stad Zottegem
1944
6th Paris-Roubaix
1945
6th Grote Prijs Stad Zottegem
8th Grote Prijs Jules Lowie
1946
1st Grote Prijs Victor Standaert
7th Omloop van Vlaanderen
7th La Flèche Wallone
1947
1st Tour of Flanders
1st Omloop van West-Vlaanderen
2nd Omloop Het Volk
6th Grote Prijs Stad Zottegem
8th Brussel-Ingooigem
