= 1947 Tour of Flanders =

31st Tour of Flanders
Race details
- Dates: 27 April 1947
- Stages: 1
- Distance: 257 km (159.7 mi)
- Winning time: 7h 03' 00"

Results
	Winner	Emiel Faignaert (BEL)	(Groene Leeuw)
	Second	Roger Desmet (BEL)	(Alcyon–Dunlop)
	Third	Rik Renders (BEL)	(Garin–Wolber)

The 31st running of the Tour of Flanders cycling classic was held on Sunday, 27 April 1947. Belgian Emiel Faignaert won the race in a tree-man sprint in Wetteren. 55 of 213 riders finished.

== Route ==
The race started in Ghent and finished in Wetteren – totaling 257 km. The course featured three categorized climbs:

- Kwaremont
- Kruisberg
- Edelareberg

== Results ==
Result
Rank	Rider	Team	Time
1	Emiel Faignaert (BEL)	Groene Leeuw	7h 03' 00"
2	Roger Desmet (BEL)	Alcyon–Dunlop	s.t.
3	Rik Renders (BEL)	Garin–Wolber	s.t.
4	Kamiel Beeckman (BEL)	Thompson	+ 12"
5	Louis Thiétard (FRA)	Métropole–Dunlop	+ 2' 05"
6	Raymond Desmedt (BEL)	Alcyon–Dunlop	+ 2' 20"
7	Kléber Piot (FRA)	Métropole–Dunlop	+ 2' 30"
8	Georges Claes (BEL)	Rochet–Dunlop	s.t.
9	Odiel Van Den Meersschaut (BEL)	Garin–Wolber	s.t.
10	Marcel Ryckaert (BEL)	Mercier–Hutchinson	+ 2' 50"
