= Deftinge =

Village in Flemish Region, Belgium

- Village
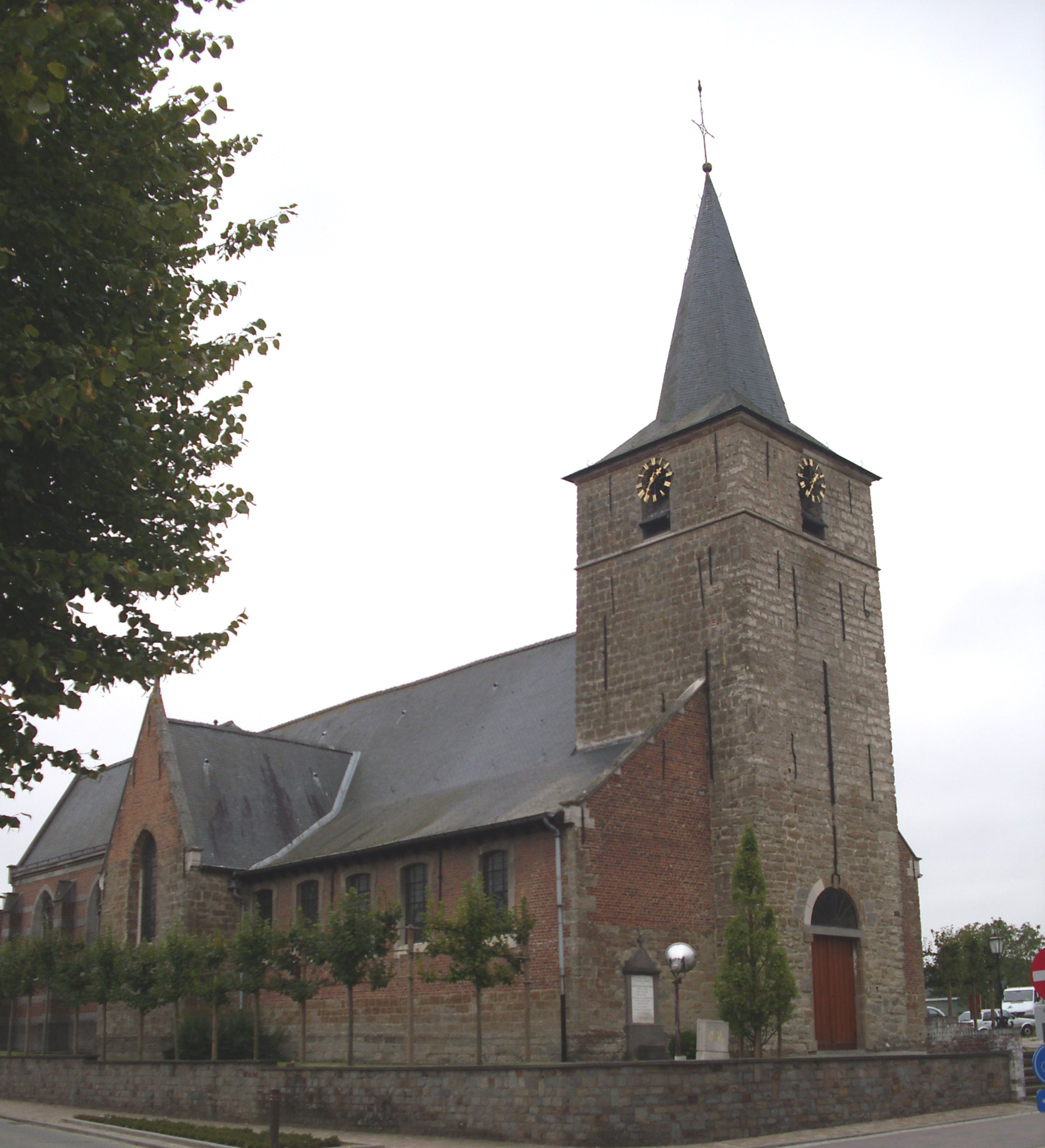
- Church of Deftinge (2009)

- Seal

- Location in Belgium
- Coordinates: 50°47′N 3°50′E
- Country: Belgium
- Region: Flemish Region
- Province: East Flanders
- Municipality: Lierde

Area
  - Total: 5.43 km^{2} (2.10 sq mi)

Population (2021)
  - Total: 1,338
  - Density: 246/km^{2} (638/sq mi)
- Time zone: CET

Deftinge is a village which makes up part of the municipality of Lierde. It is located in the Denderstreek and in the Flemish Ardennes, the hilly southern part of the Belgian province of East Flanders. It was an independent municipality until 1977 when it was merged into Lierde.

== Overview ==
The village was first mentioned as Davatinge in the middle of the 11th century. The village was a part of the heerlijkheid and barony of Boelare during the Middle Ages. The municipality was merged into Lierde in 1977.

The village's coat of arms is of unknown origin. The arms were granted on 24 February 1819 and confirmed on 21 July 1843.

== Notable people ==
- Ferdi Van Den Haute (1952), road bicycle racer.

== Gallery ==
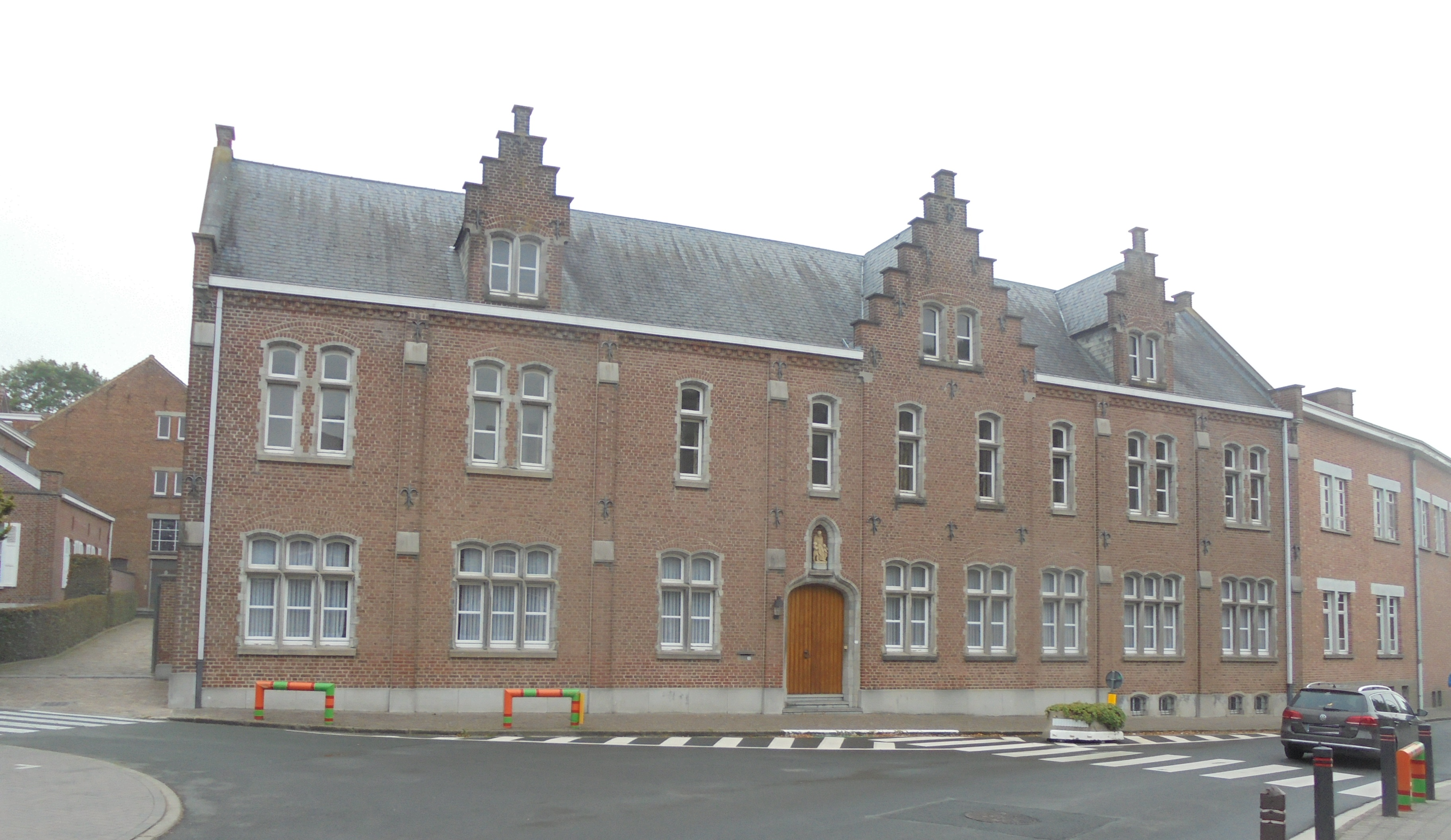
Former monastery

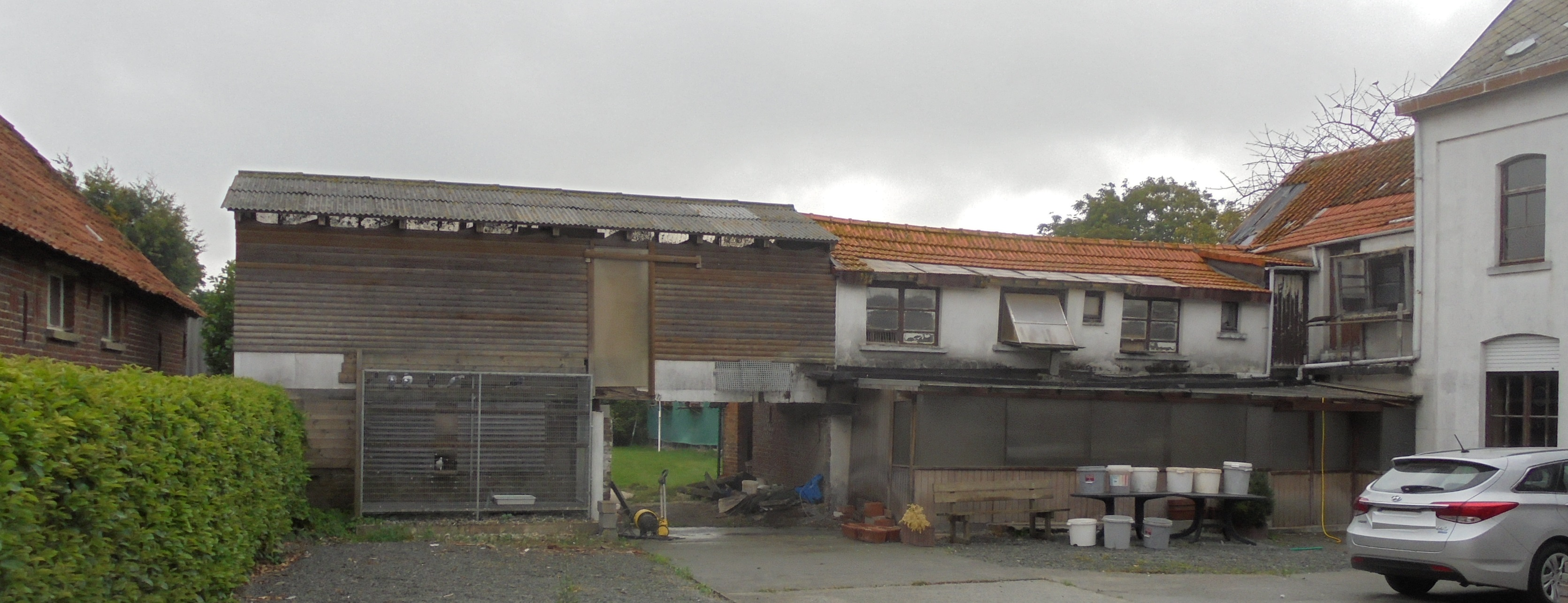
Dovecote

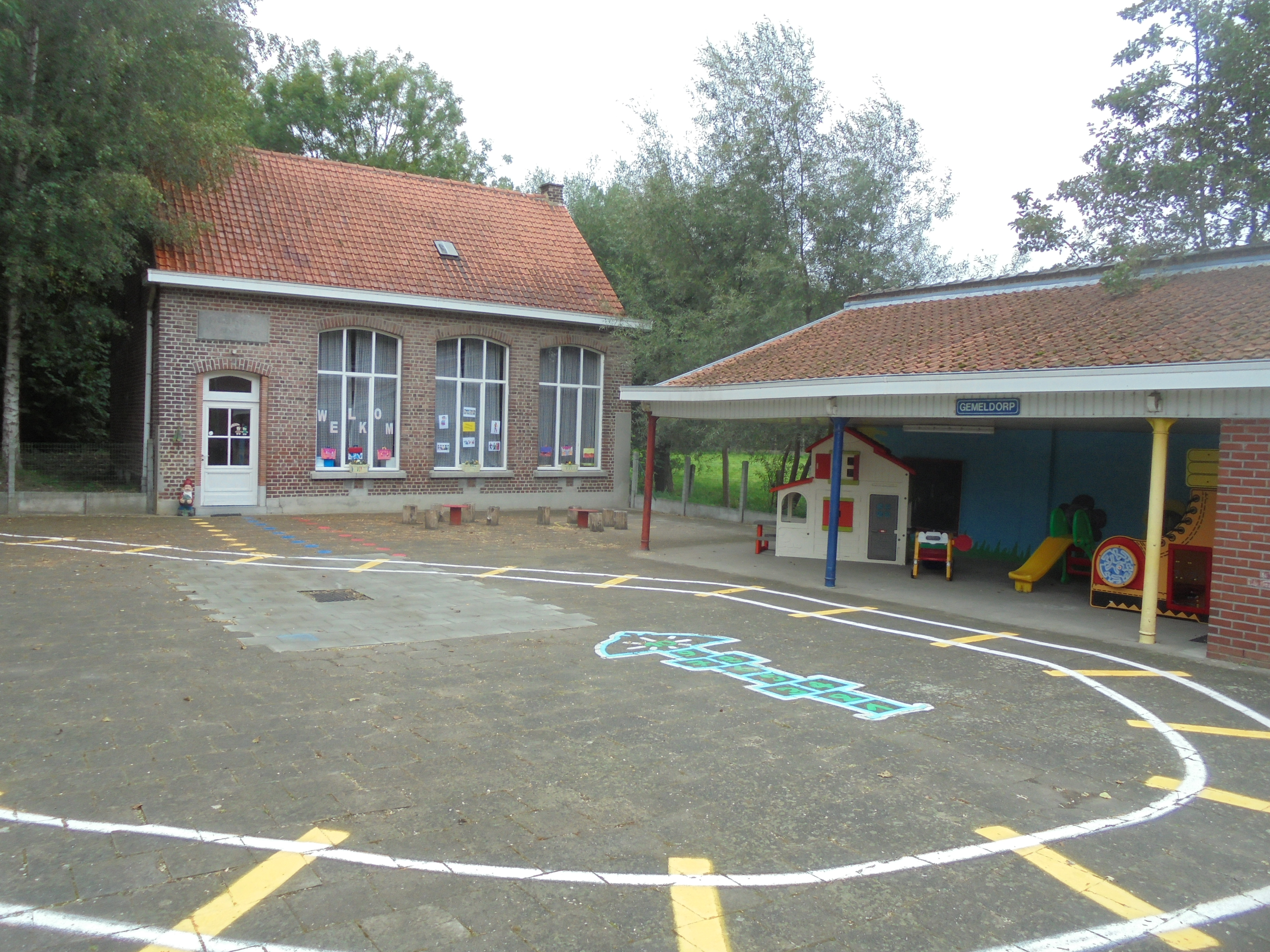
School

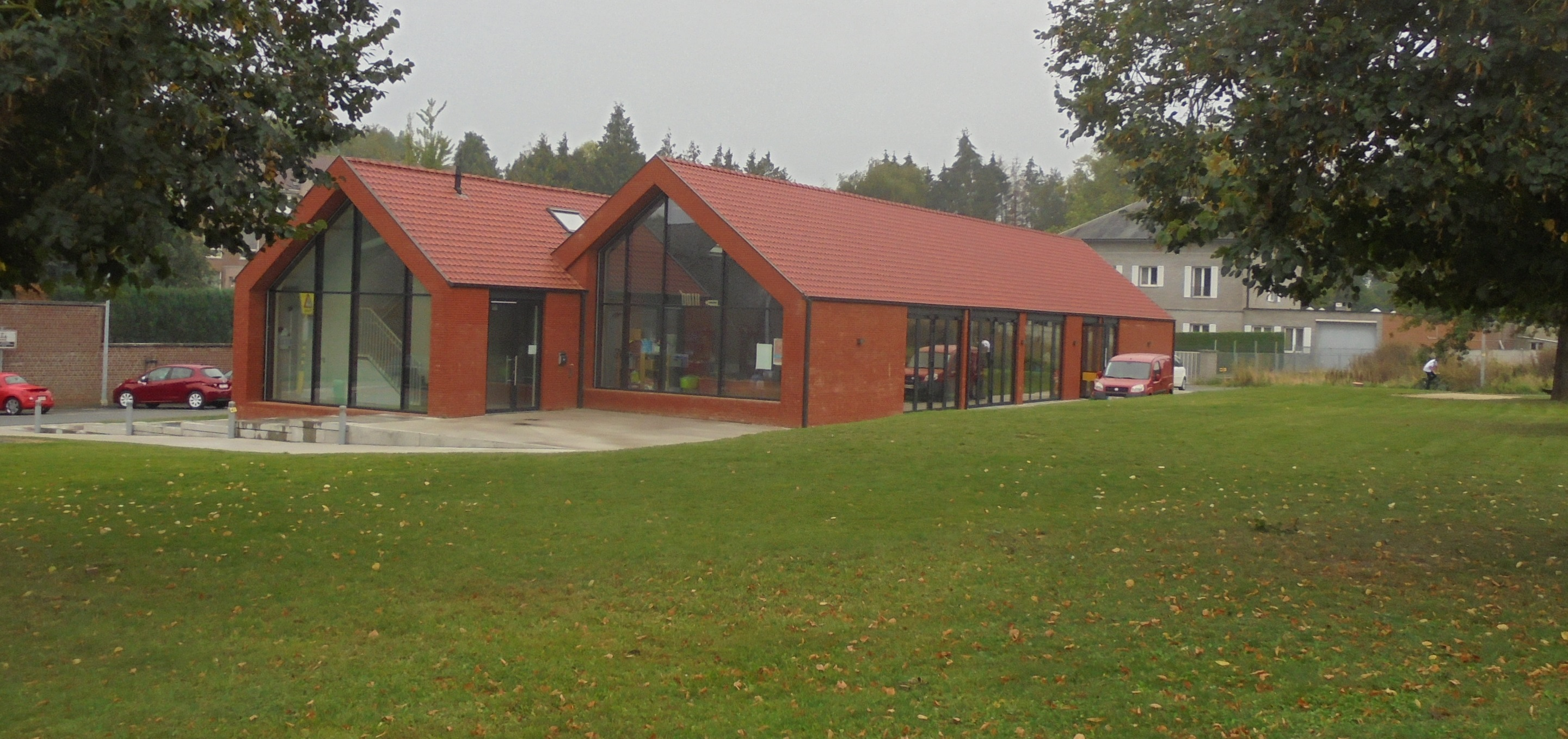
Community centre
