= Sint-Martens-Lierde =

- Village
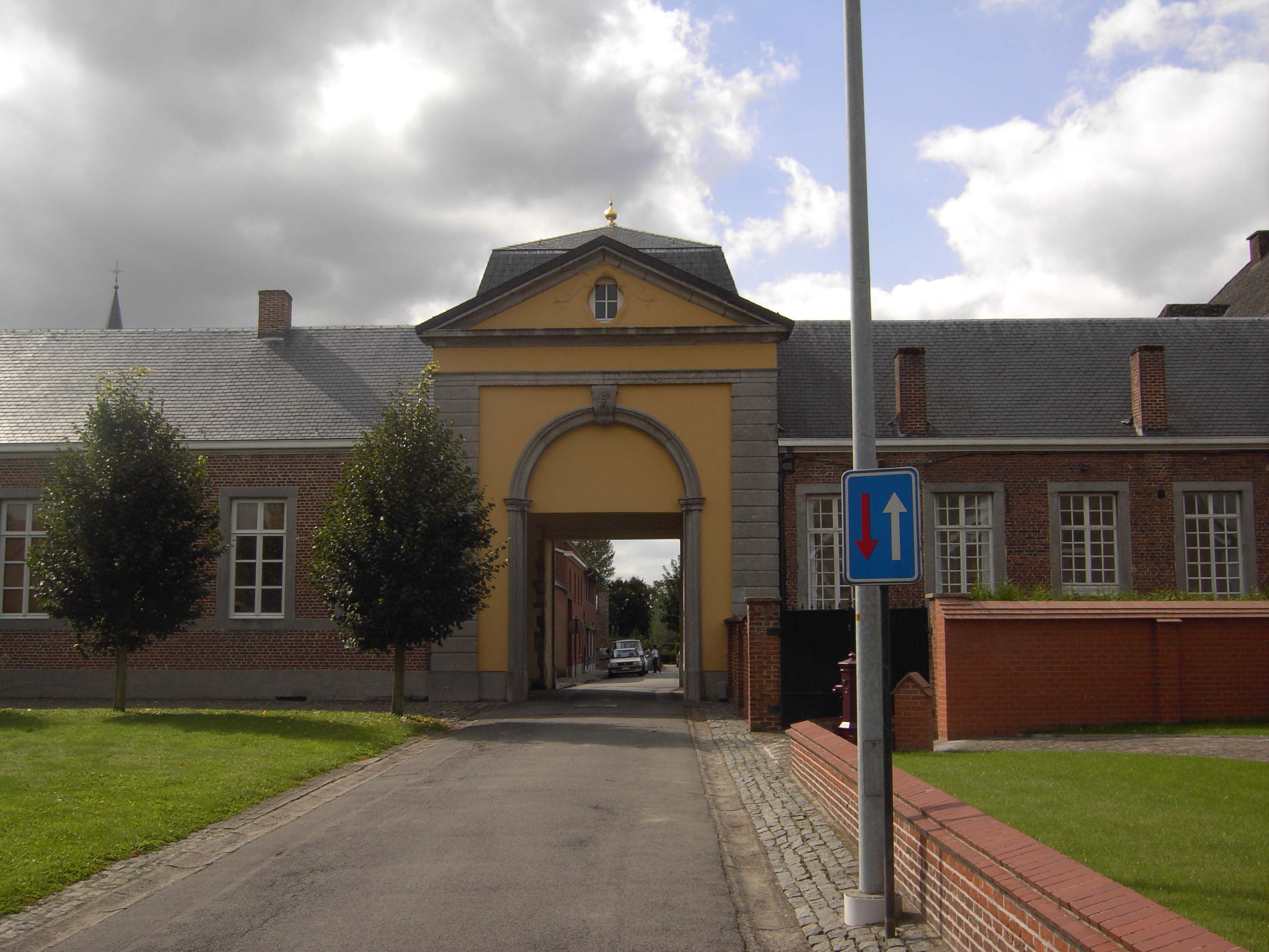
- Carthusian Priory (2008)

- Location in Belgium
- Coordinates: 50.80427°N 3.82473°E
- Country: Belgium
- Region: Flemish Region
- Province: East Flanders
- Municipality: Lierde

Area
  - Total: 6.90 km^{2} (2.66 sq mi)

Population (2021)
  - Total: 1,918
  - Density: 278/km^{2} (720/sq mi)
- Time zone: CET

Sint-Martens-Lierde is a village which is part of the municipality of Lierde. It is located in the Denderstreek and in the Flemish Ardennes, the hilly southern part of the Belgian province of East Flanders.

== Overview ==
The village was first mentioned in 1189 as "Lierde sancti Martini". In 1329, the Carthusian priory "Sint-Maartens-Bos" was established. In 1783, the monastery was dissolved and became a parish church. In 1788, most of the monastery was demolished.

In 1867, the railway line Melle-Geraardsbergen was constructed with a train station at Sint-Martens-Lierde. The station was later closed.

The village's coat of arms shows some agricultural implements, and was granted in 1818.

== Notable people ==
- Emiel Faignaert (1919–1980), cyclist.

== Gallery ==
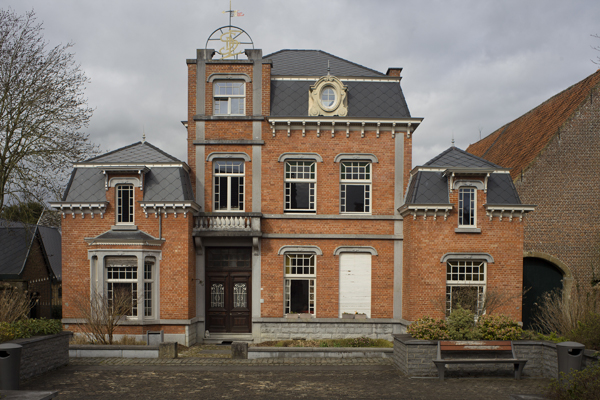
House in Sint-Martens-Lierde

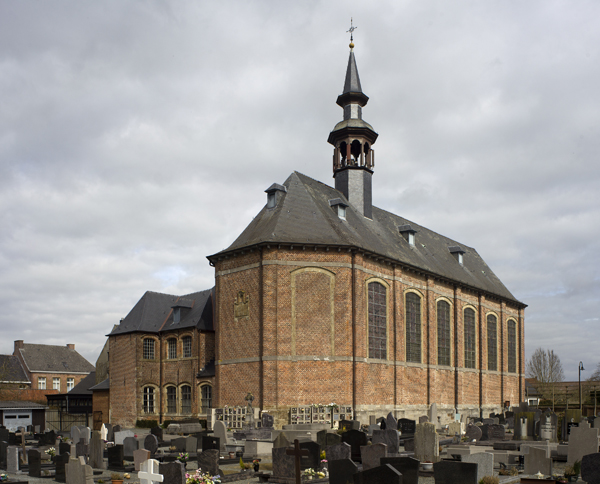
St Martin's Church
