= Hemelveerdegem =

- Village
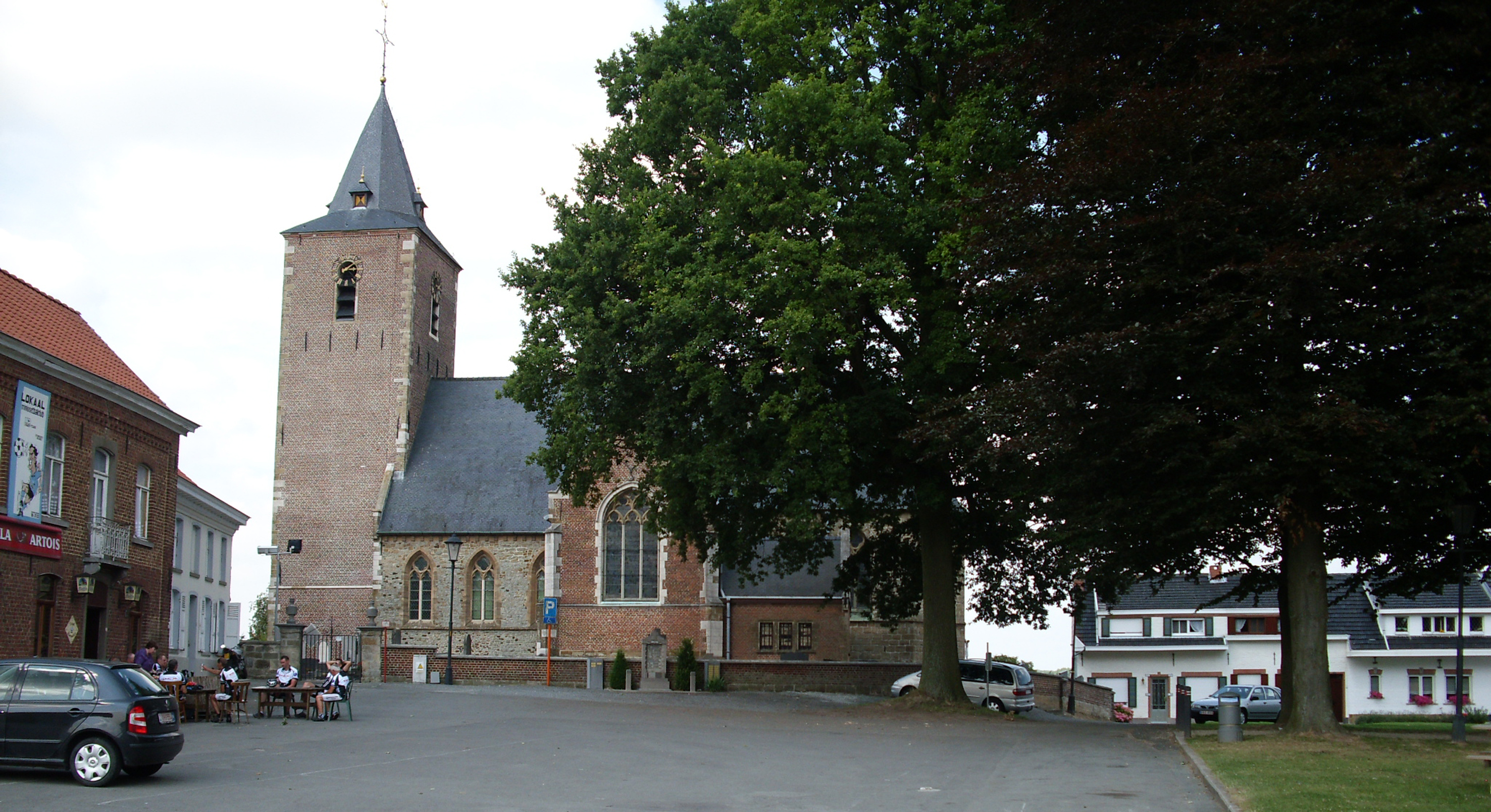
- Saint John the Baptist Church of Hemelveerdegem (2009)

- Seal

- Location in Belgium
- Coordinates: 50°48′N 3°51′E
- Country: Belgium
- Region: Flemish Region
- Province: East Flanders
- Municipality: Lierde

Area
  - Total: 2.80 km^{2} (1.08 sq mi)

Population (2021)
  - Total: 383
  - Density: 137/km^{2} (354/sq mi)
- Time zone: CET

Hemelveerdegem is a village and borough which makes up part of the municipality of Lierde in the Denderstreek in the Belgian province of East Flanders. The village and estate were ruled from 1752 by the armigerous Boelare family.

== Overview ==
The village was first mentioned around 963 as Ermfredeghe. In 1752, the village became part of the barony of Boelare. In 1977, the municipality was merged into Lierde.

The Saint John the Baptist Church mainly dates from the 18th century, however some parts have been estimated to originate from the 14th to 16th century. The reredos (altar piece) dates from the early 16th century, and is considered a masterpiece of wood work. The church has been designated a protected monument in 1969.

The village's coat of arms shows a beehive with a lion behind it. The arms were granted on 4 August 1818 and were confirmed on 7 September 1928.
