= Flemish Ardennes =

Hilly region in East Flanders, Belgium

Coordinates: 50°49′N 3°40′E

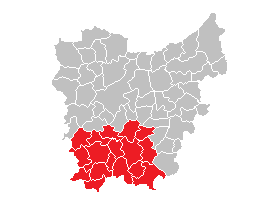
Municipalities in the Flemish Ardennes, East Flanders

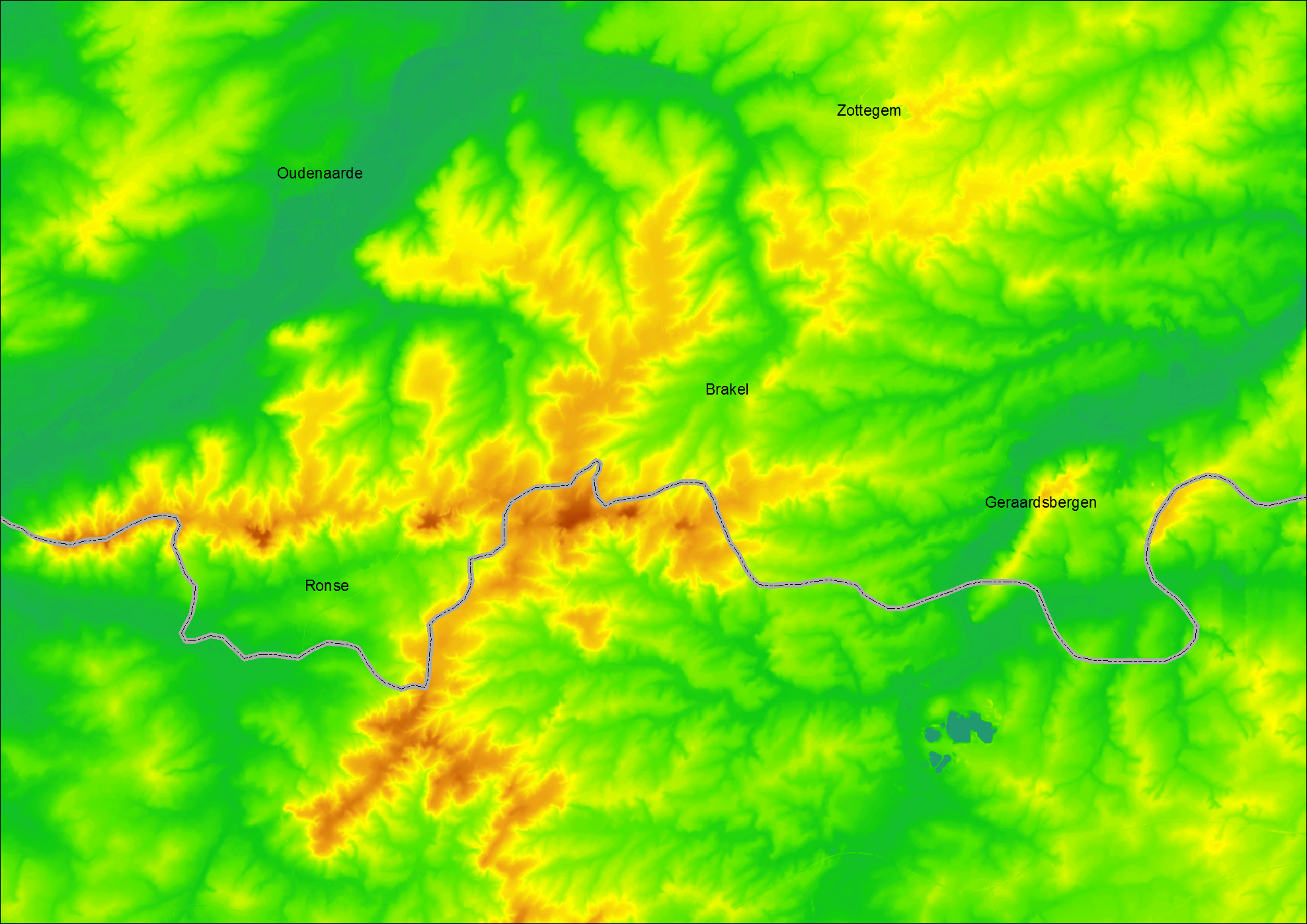
Hills in the Flemish Ardennes, East Flanders

The Flemish Ardennes (Dutch: Vlaamse Ardennen) is an informal name given to a hilly region in the south of the province of East Flanders, Belgium. Highest summit is the Hotondberg (151 m). Main characteristics of the region are rural hilly landscapes with hilltop bluebell woodlands (Muziekbos, Brakelbos, Kluisbos), windmills and watermills.

The area is distinct and not adjacent to the larger Ardennes, which is further to the south east of the country in Wallonia, France, Germany and Luxembourg.

Among the largest towns in the area are Oudenaarde, Ronse, Zottegem and Geraardsbergen.

Cycling is particularly popular in the Flemish Ardennes. Many major bike races are held here, including a large part of the Tour of Flanders. Most of its toughest climbs (Koppenberg, Taaienberg, Molenberg, Paterberg, Oude Kwaremont, Muur van Geraardsbergen, Eikenberg) and most of its cobblestone-street sections (Paddestraat) are situated in the Flemish Ardennes.

== Photos ==
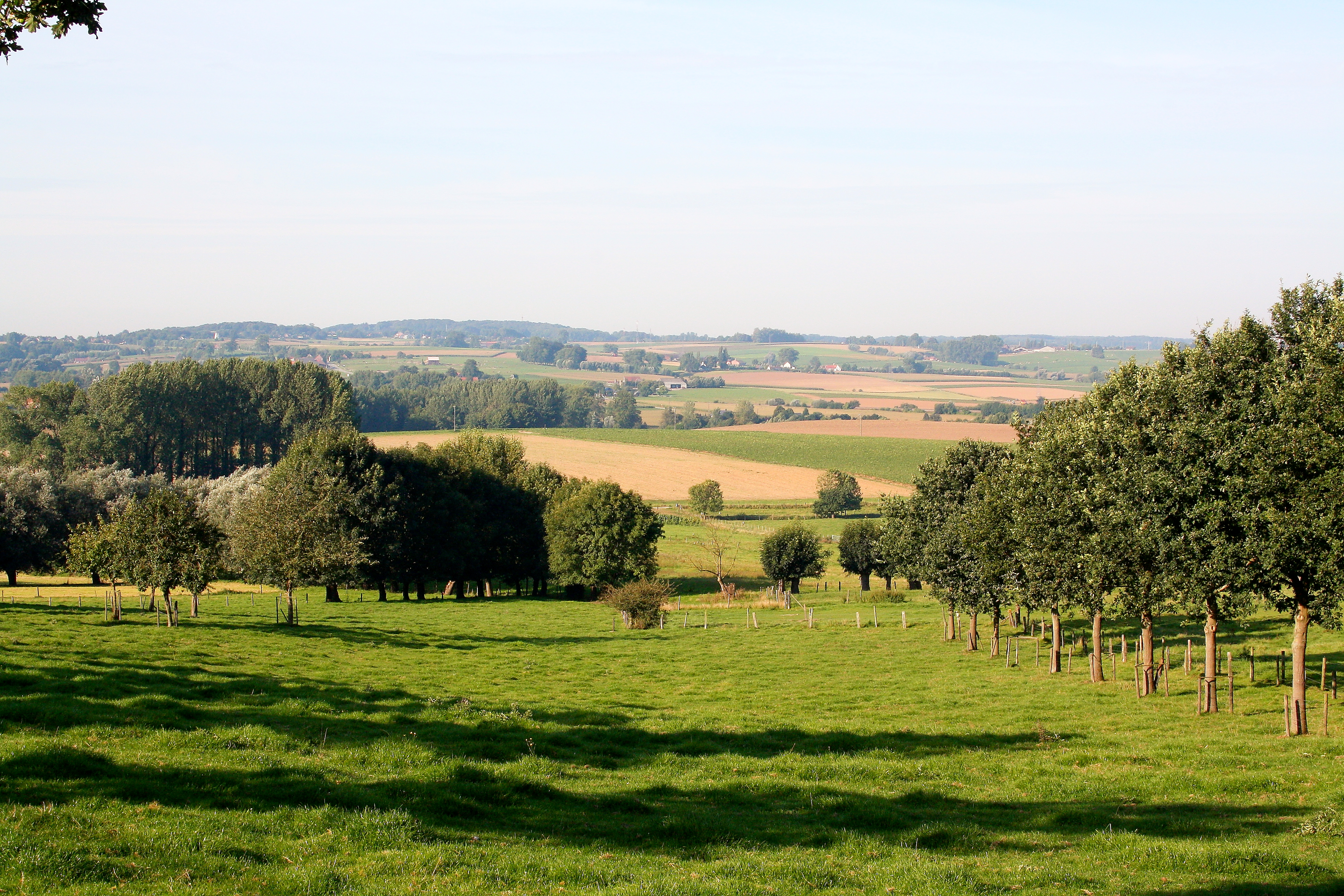
hilly countryside in Maarkedal

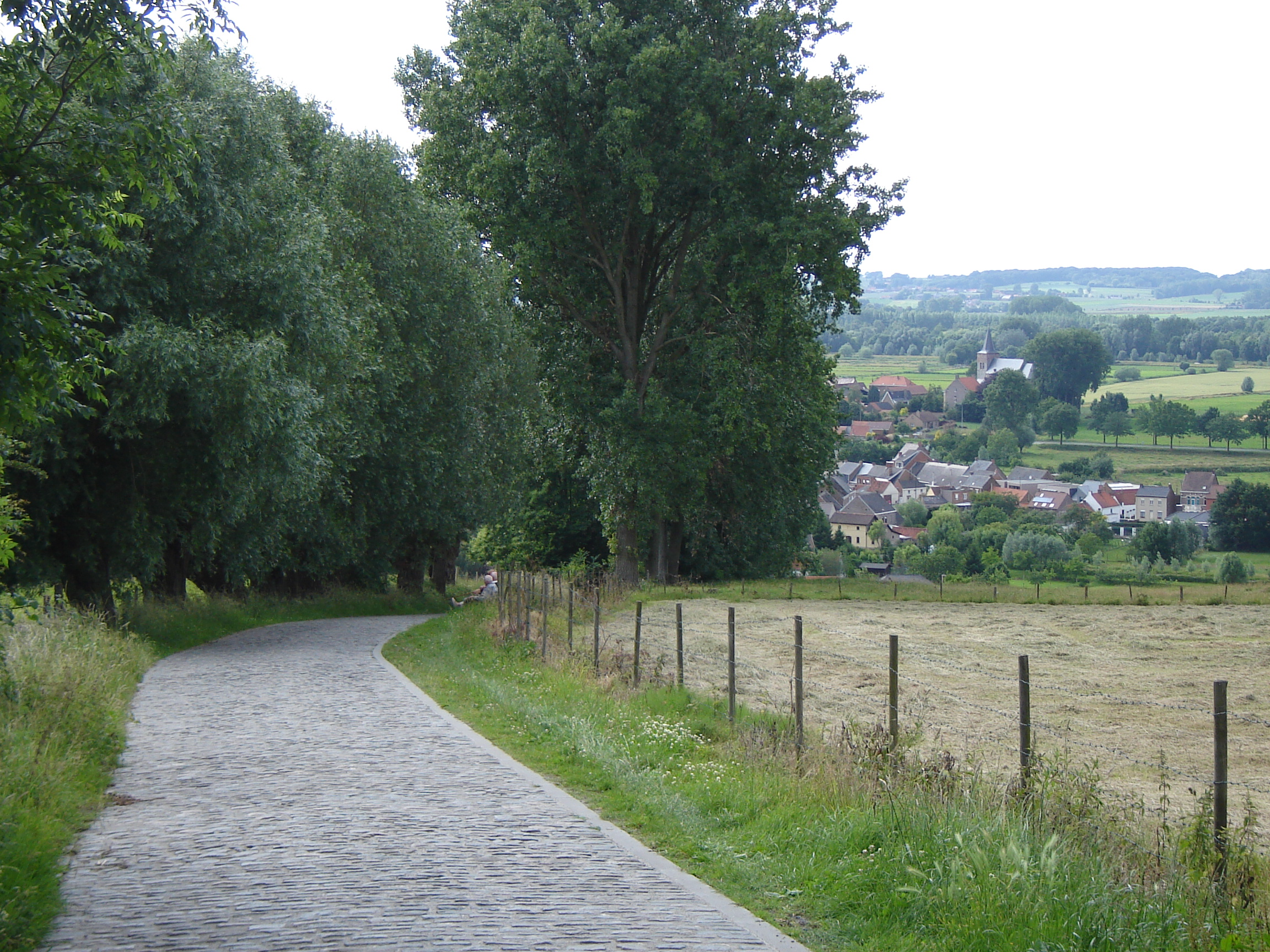
Koppenberg

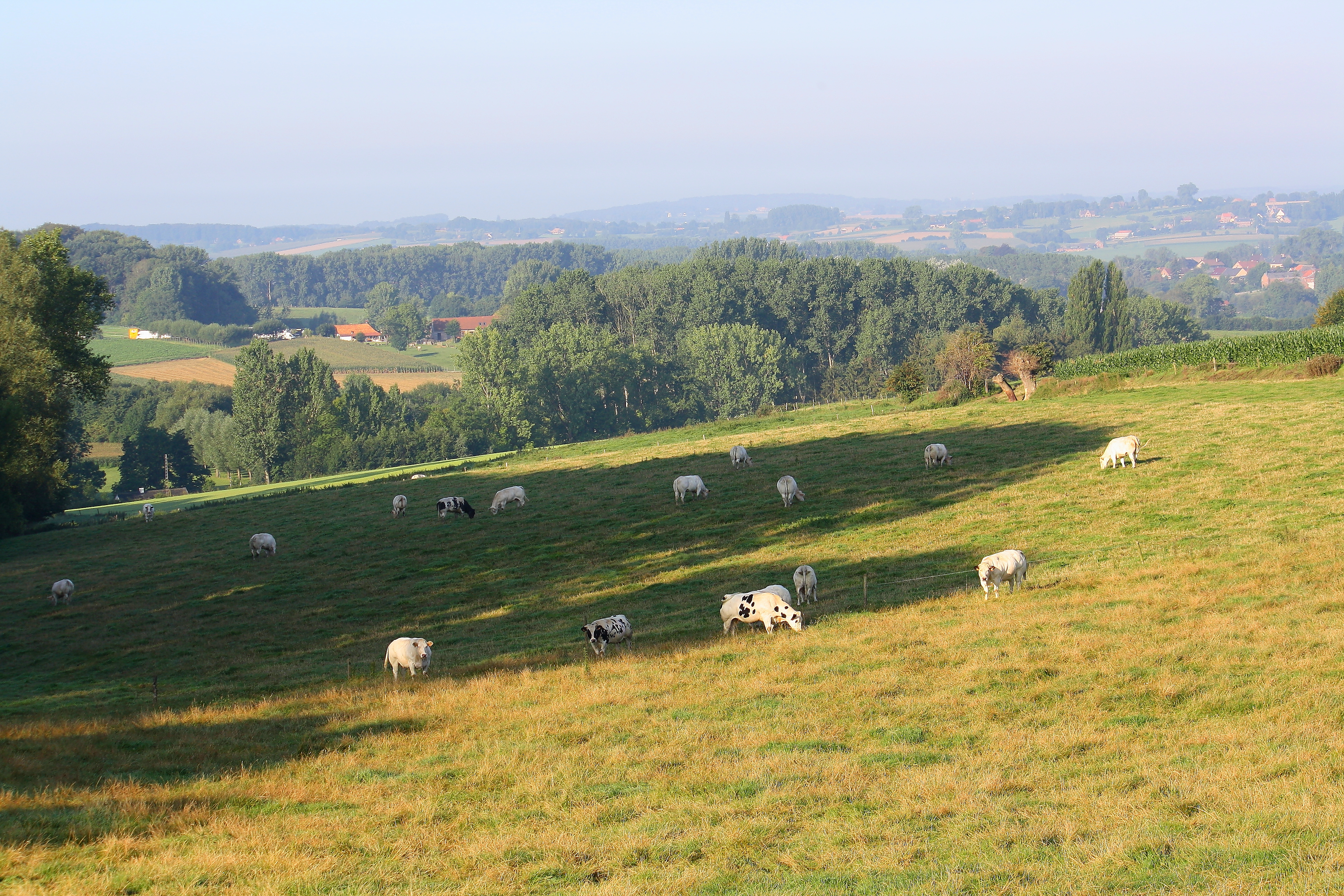
hilly countryside in Maarkedal

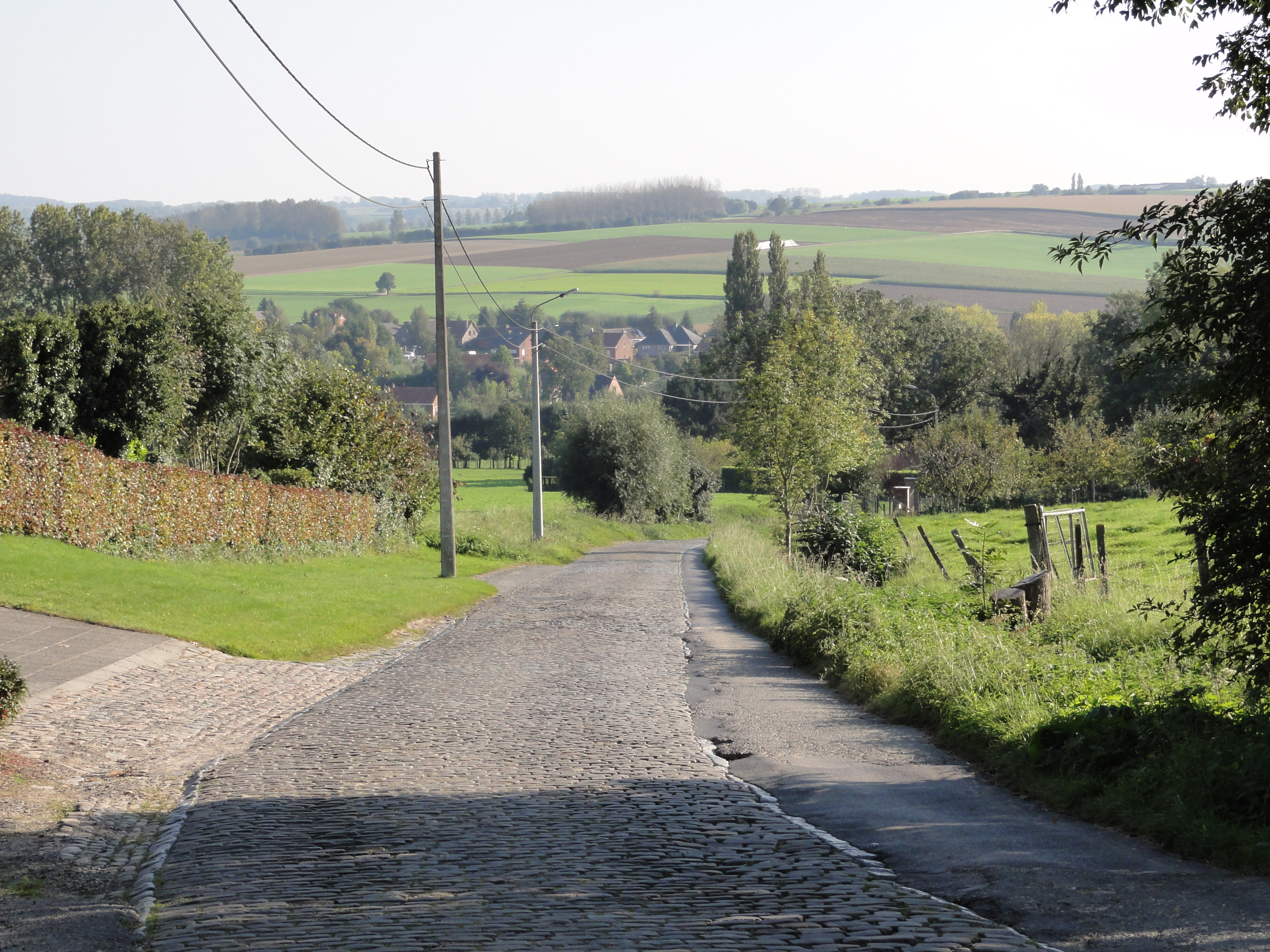
Eikenberg

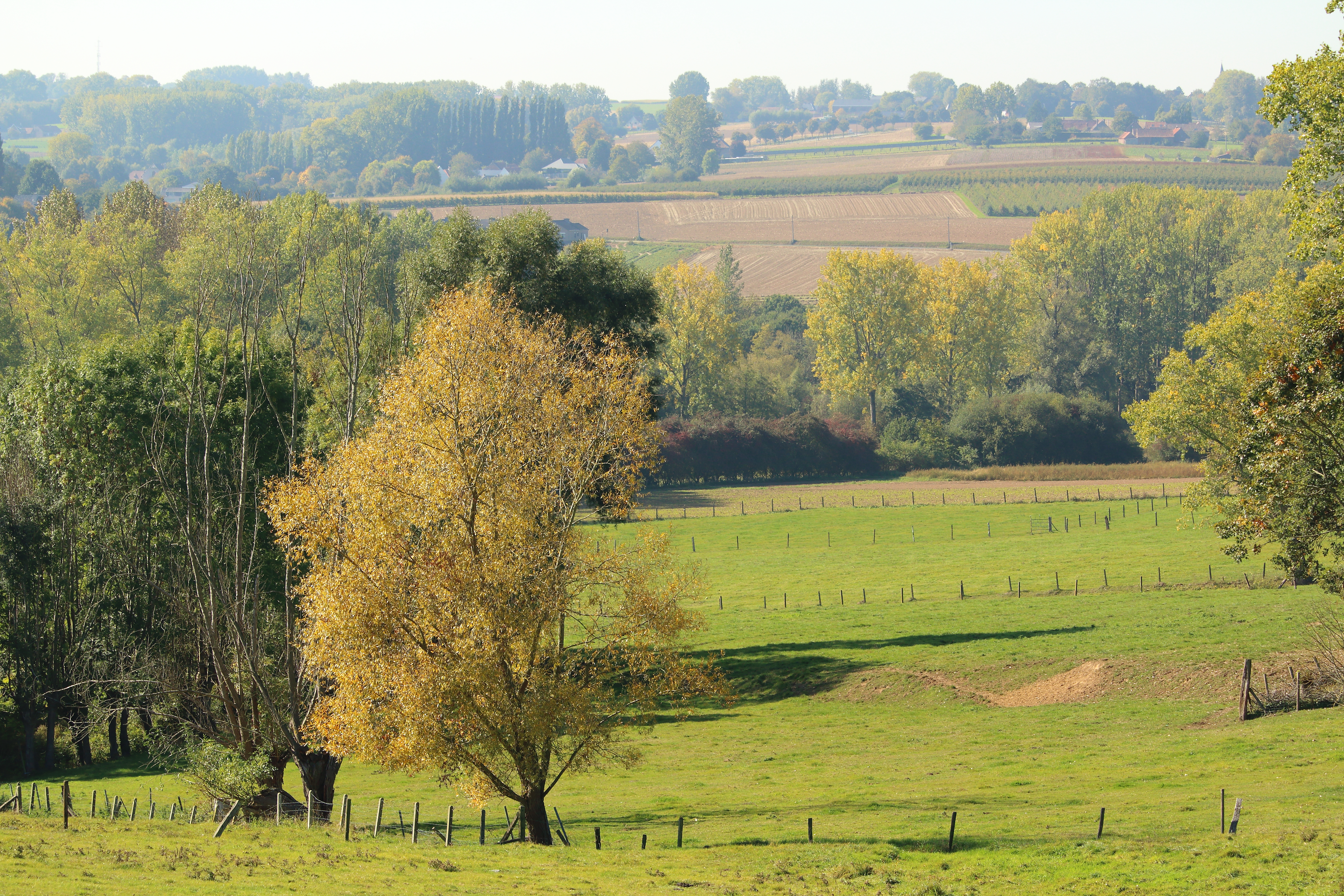
hilly countryside in Zottegem

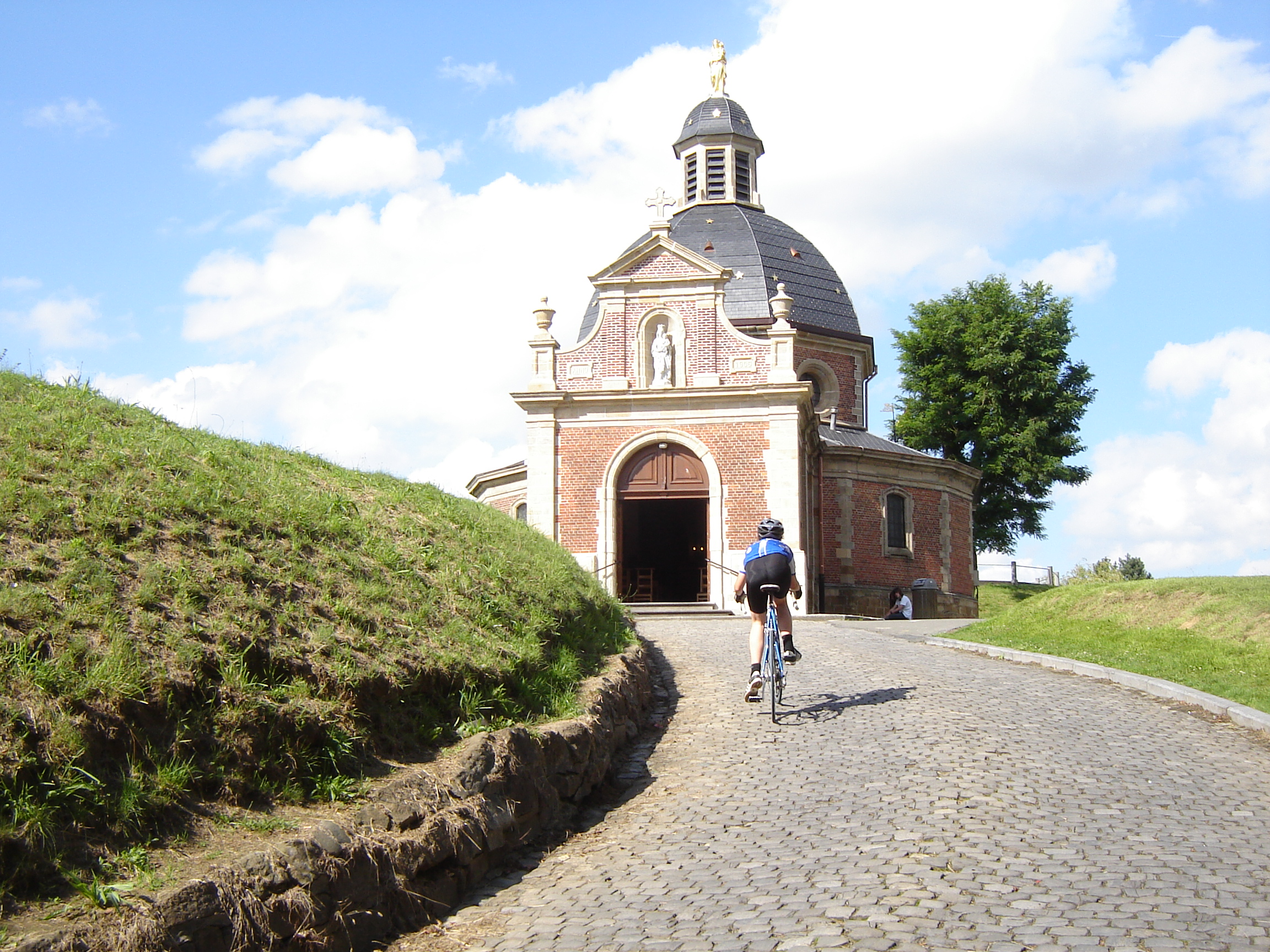
Muur van Geraardsbergen

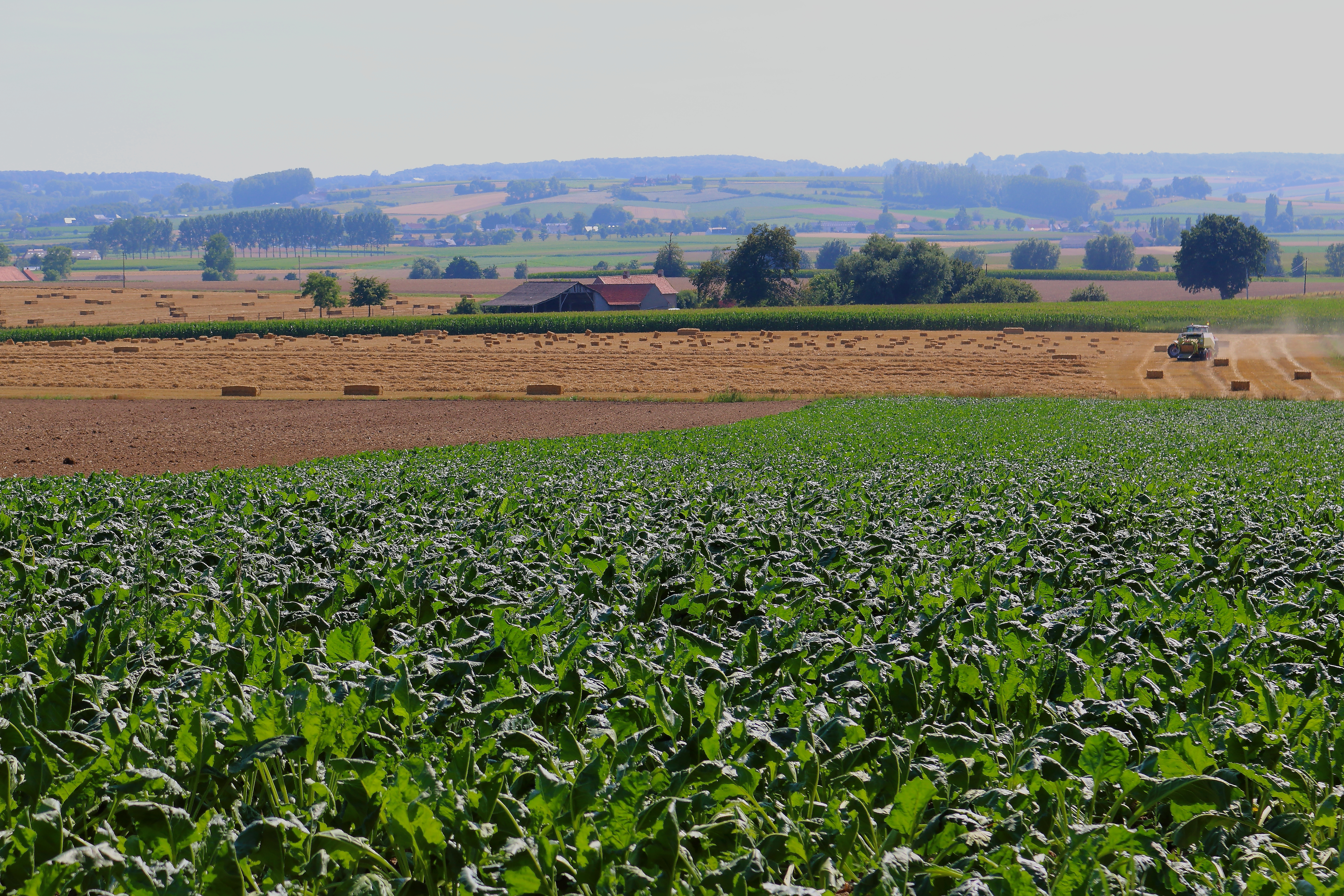
hilly countryside in Oudenaarde

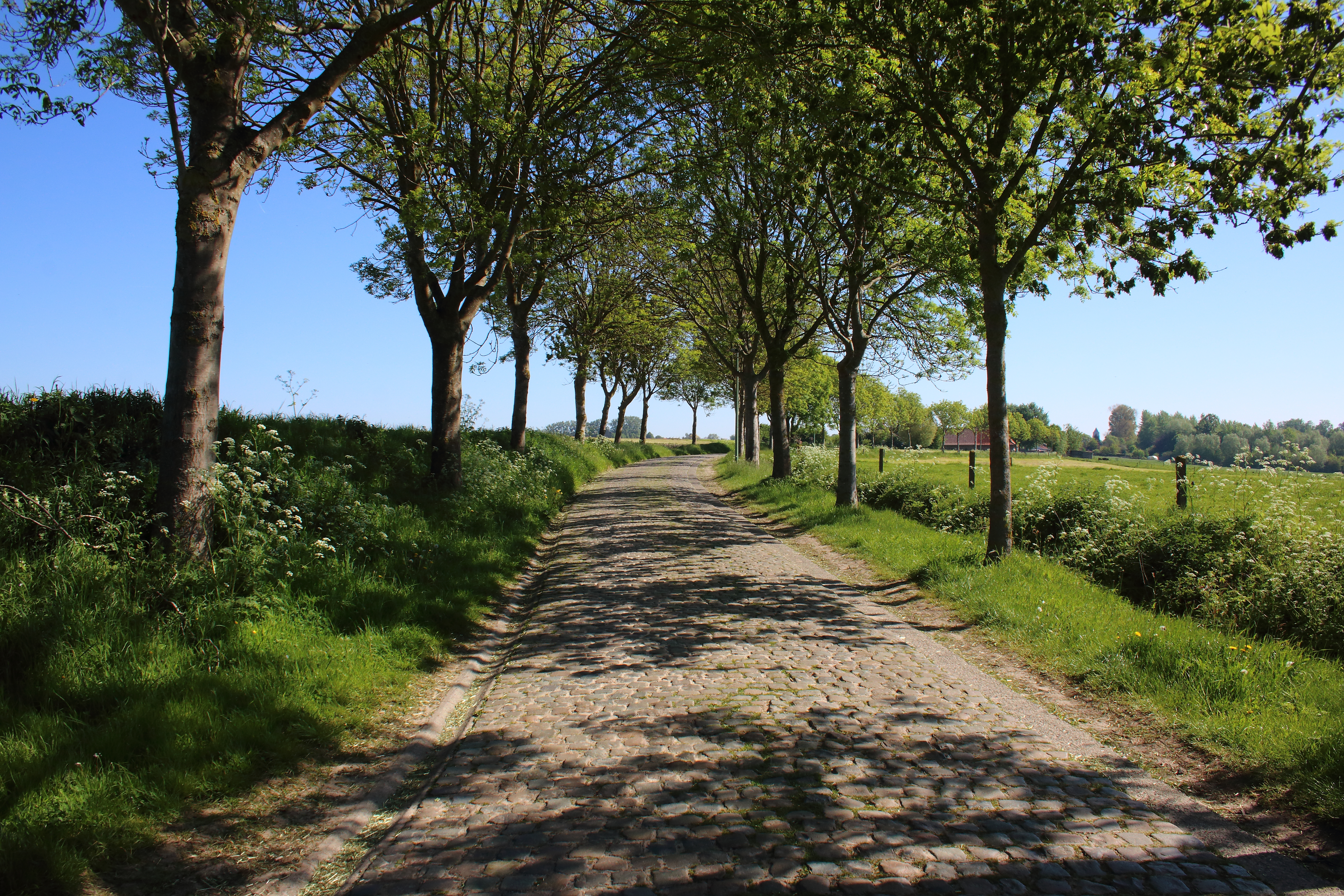
Paddestraat

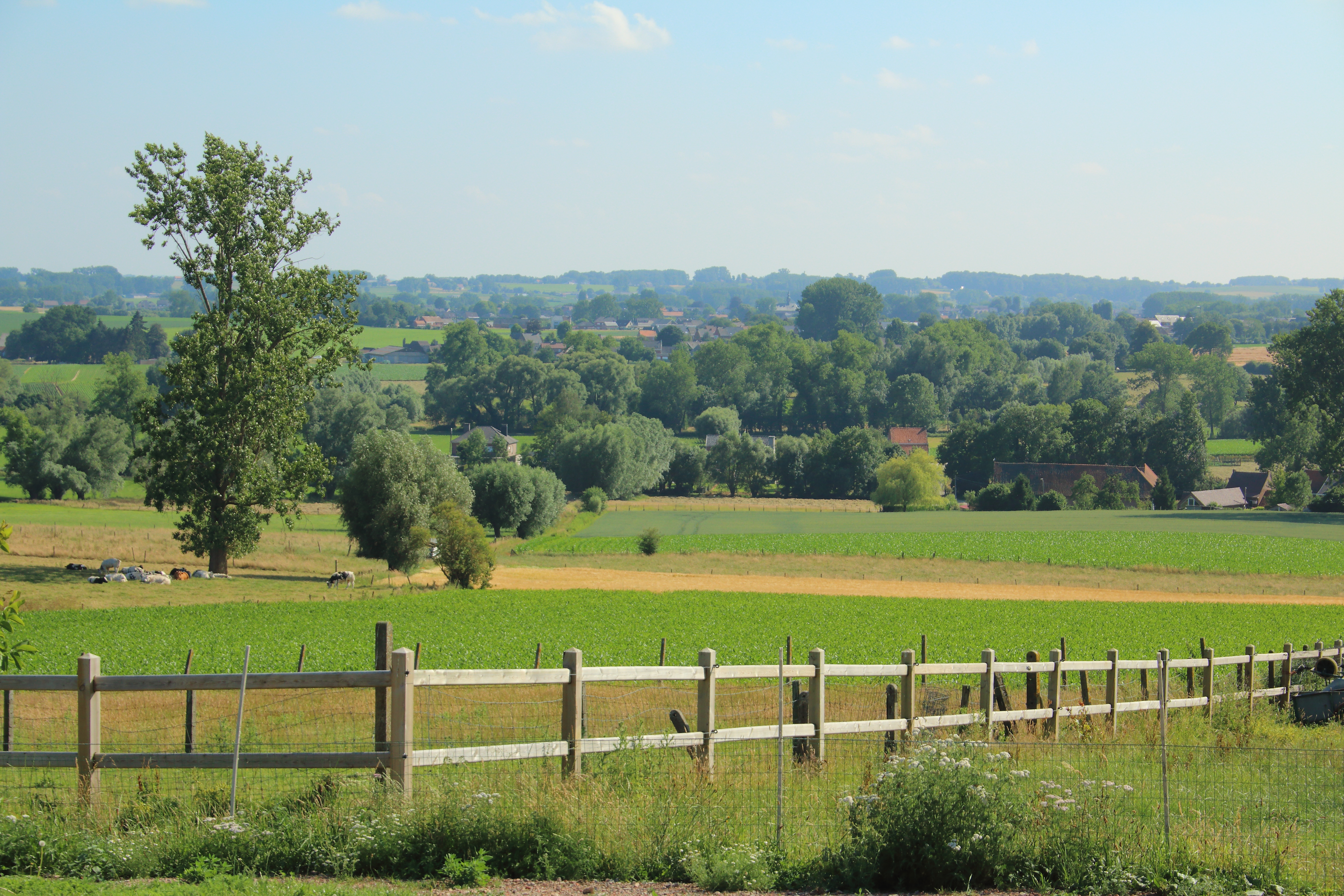
hilly countryside in Lierde

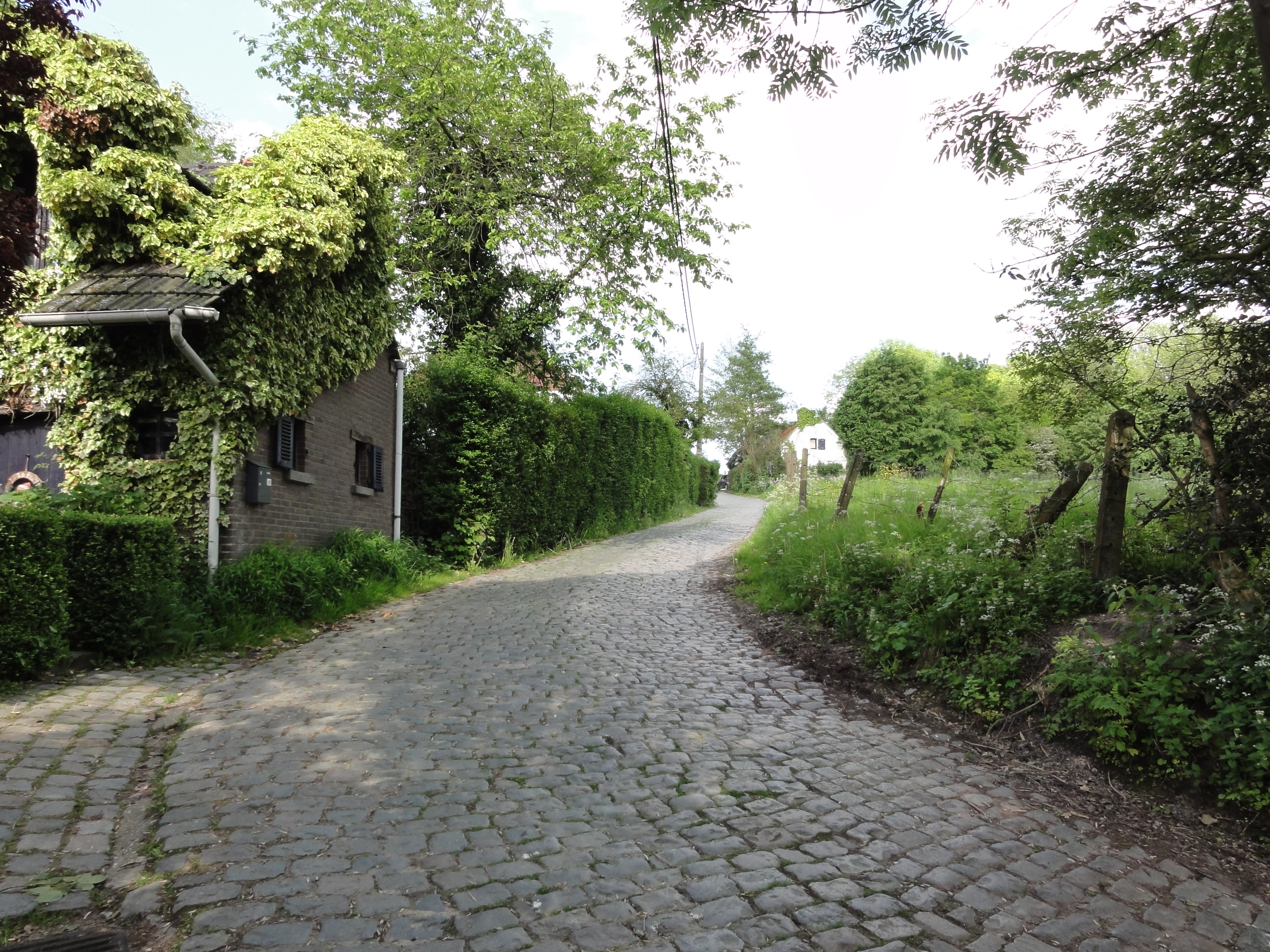
Molenberg

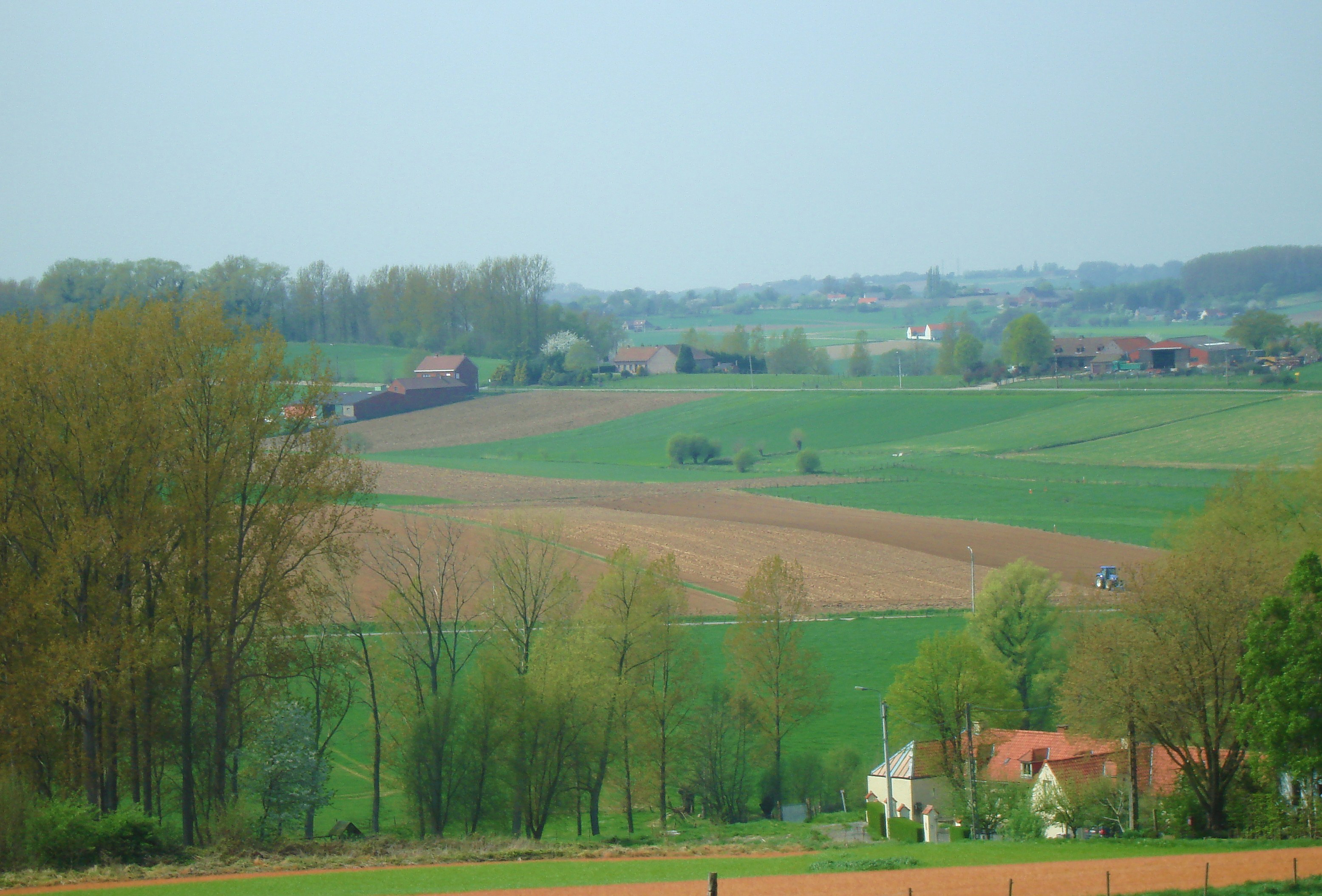
hilly countryside in Maarkedal

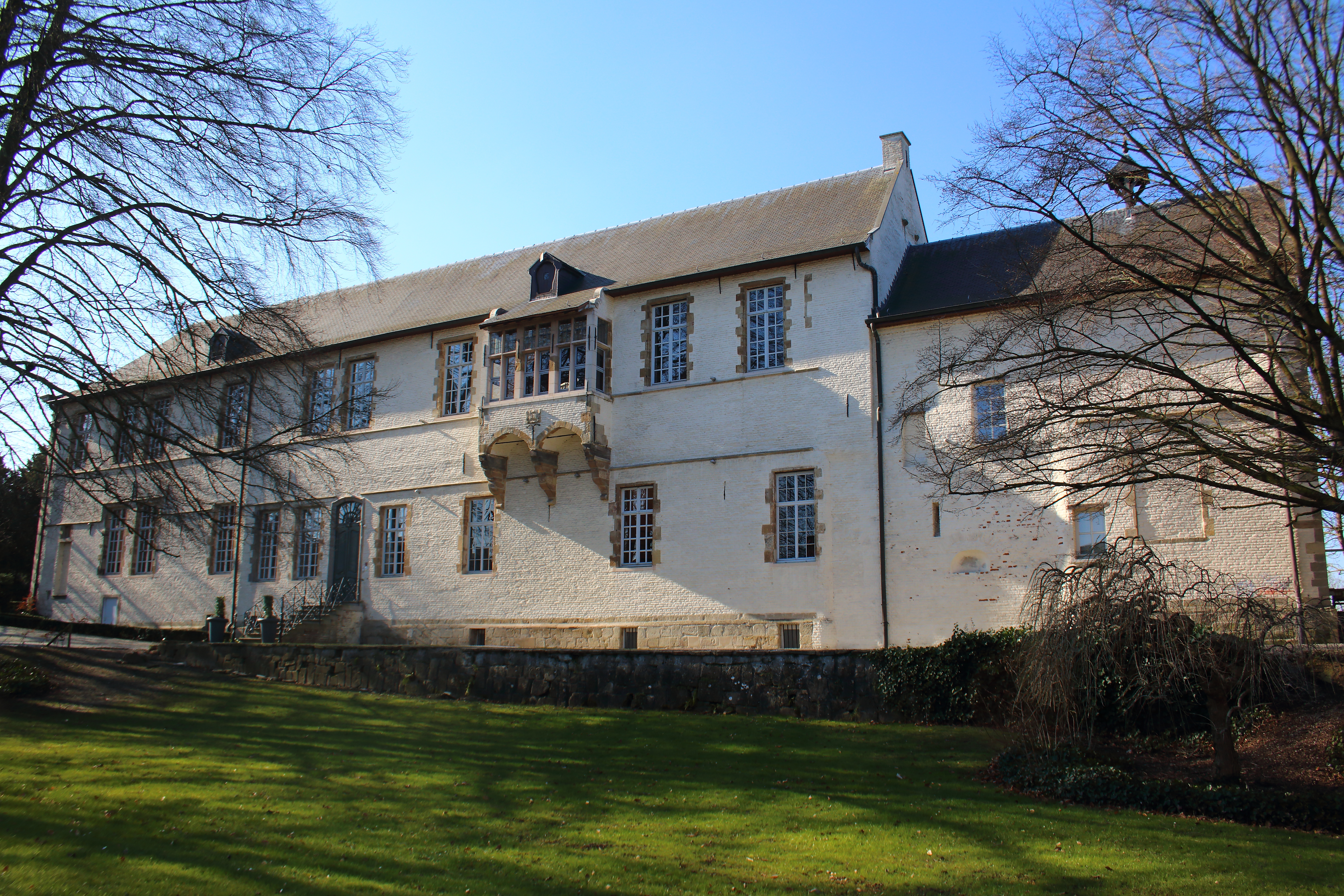
Egmont's castle in Zottegem

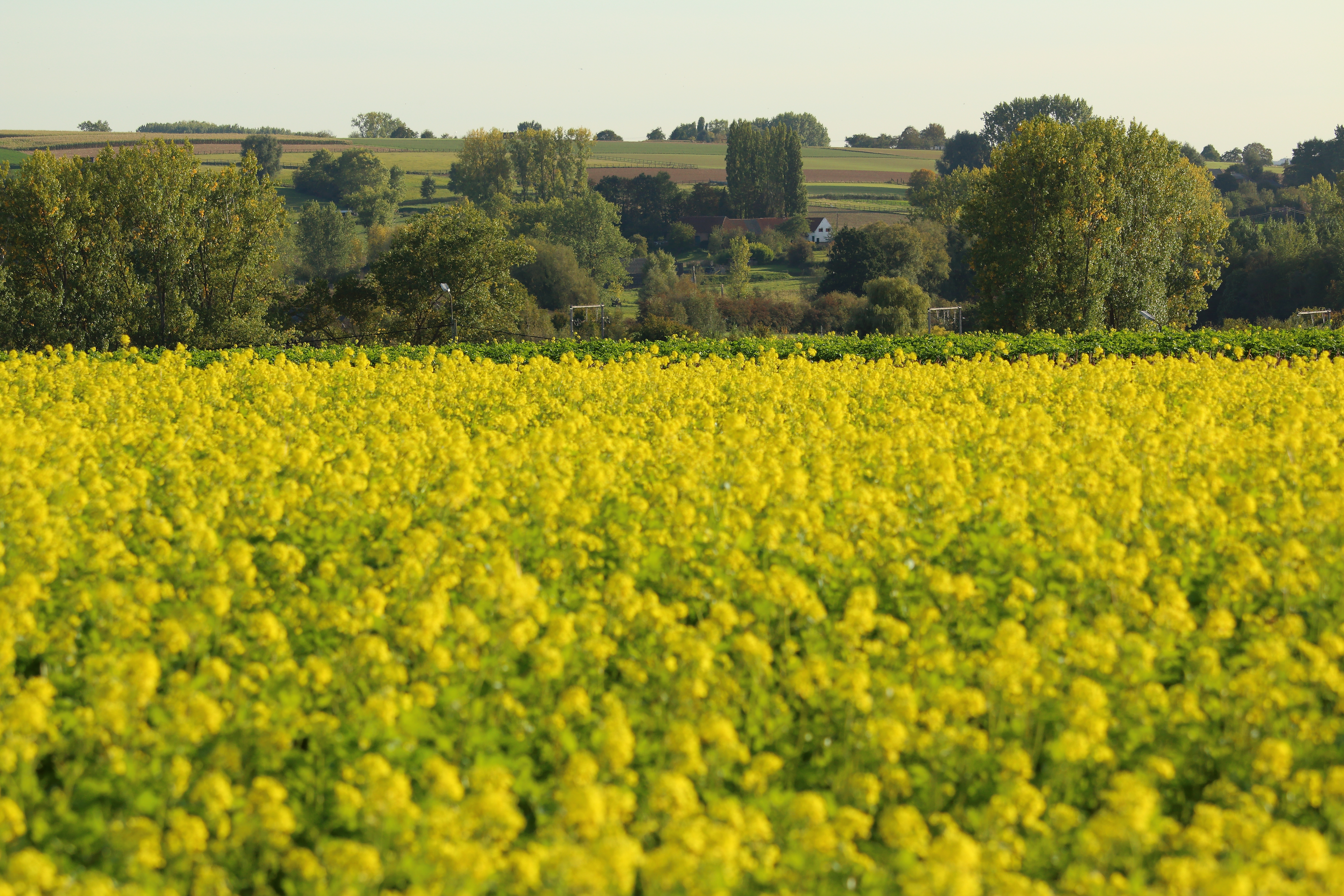
hilly countryside in Zottegem

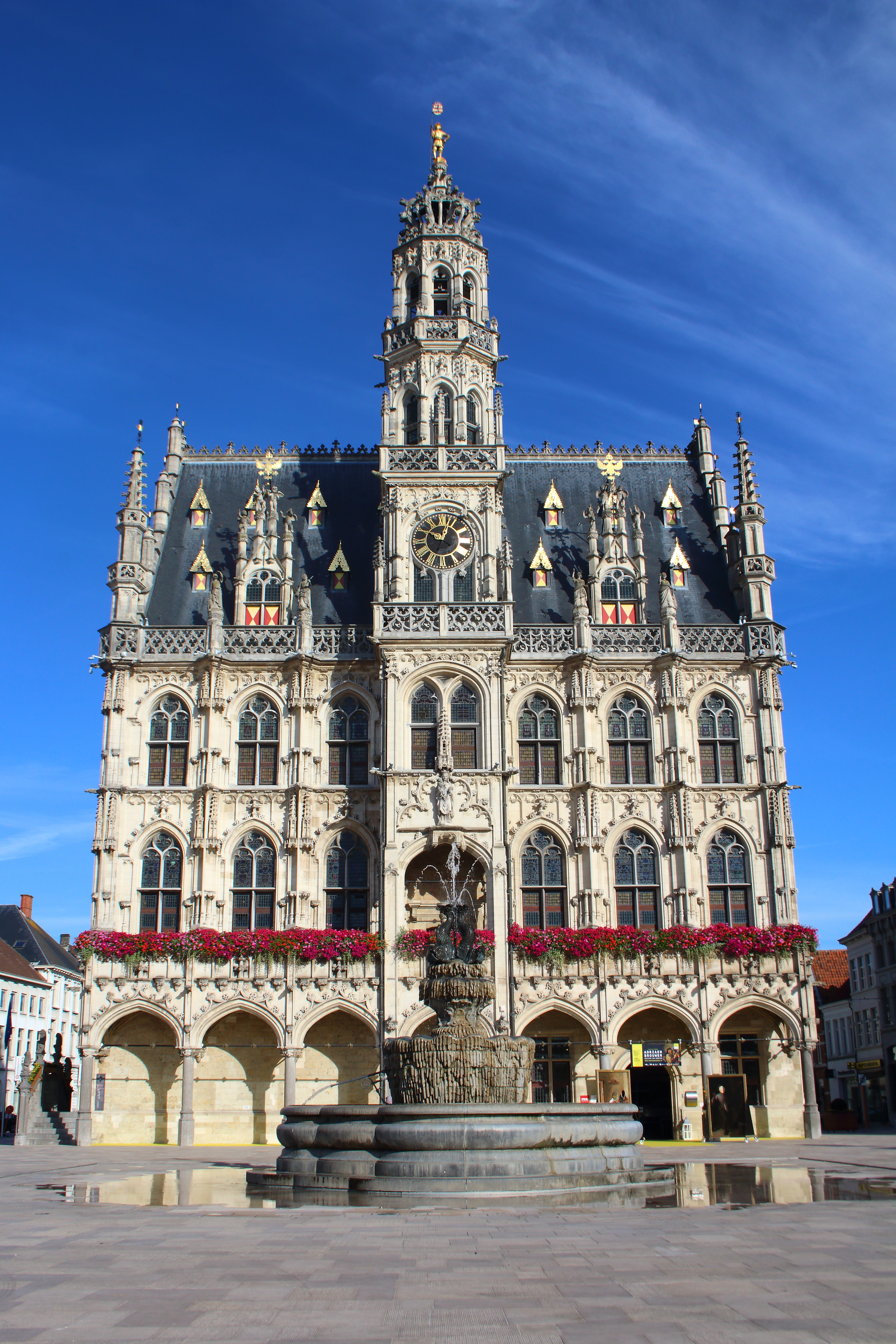
Oudenaarde Town Hall

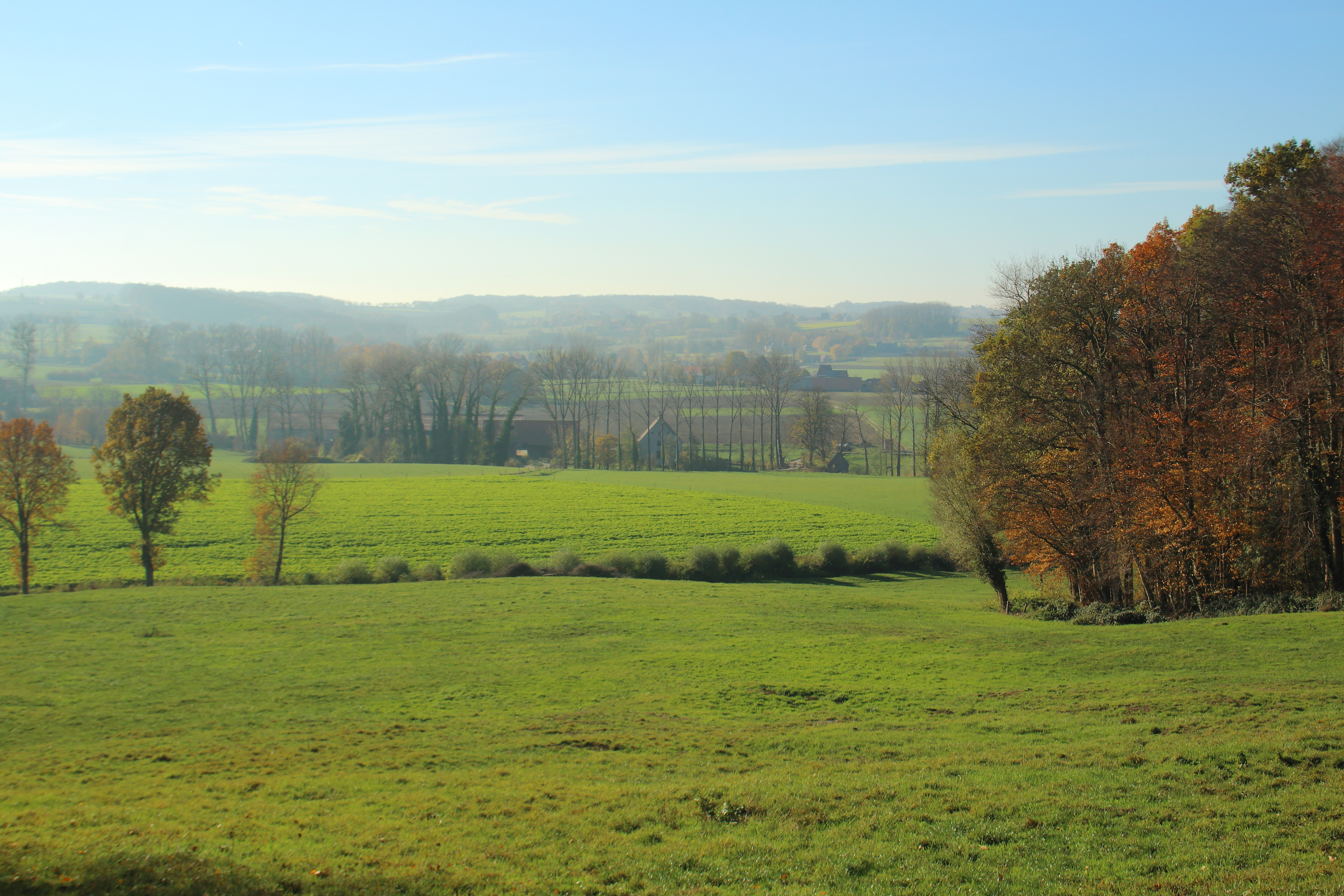
hilly countryside in Kluisbergen

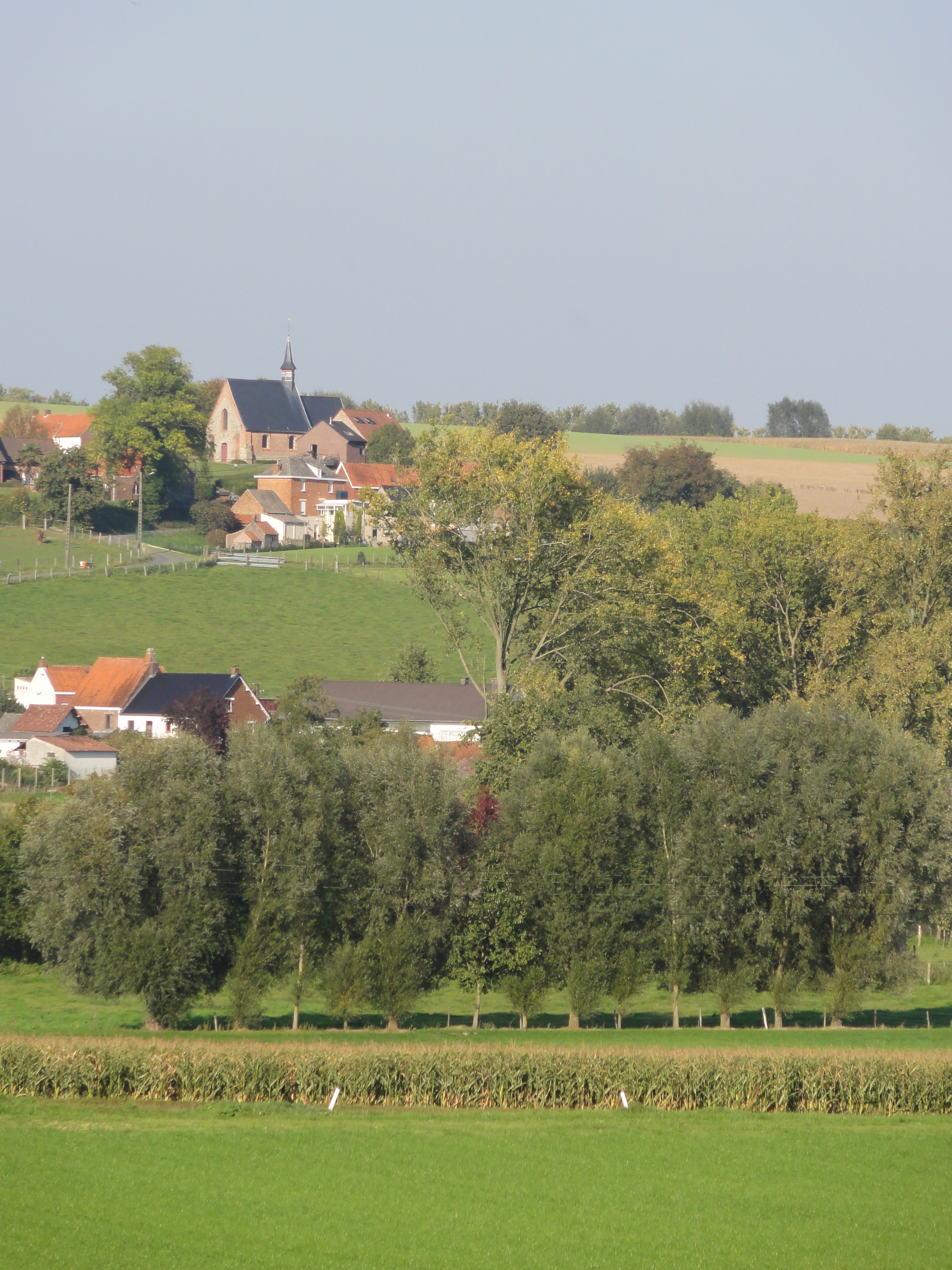
Kapelleberg

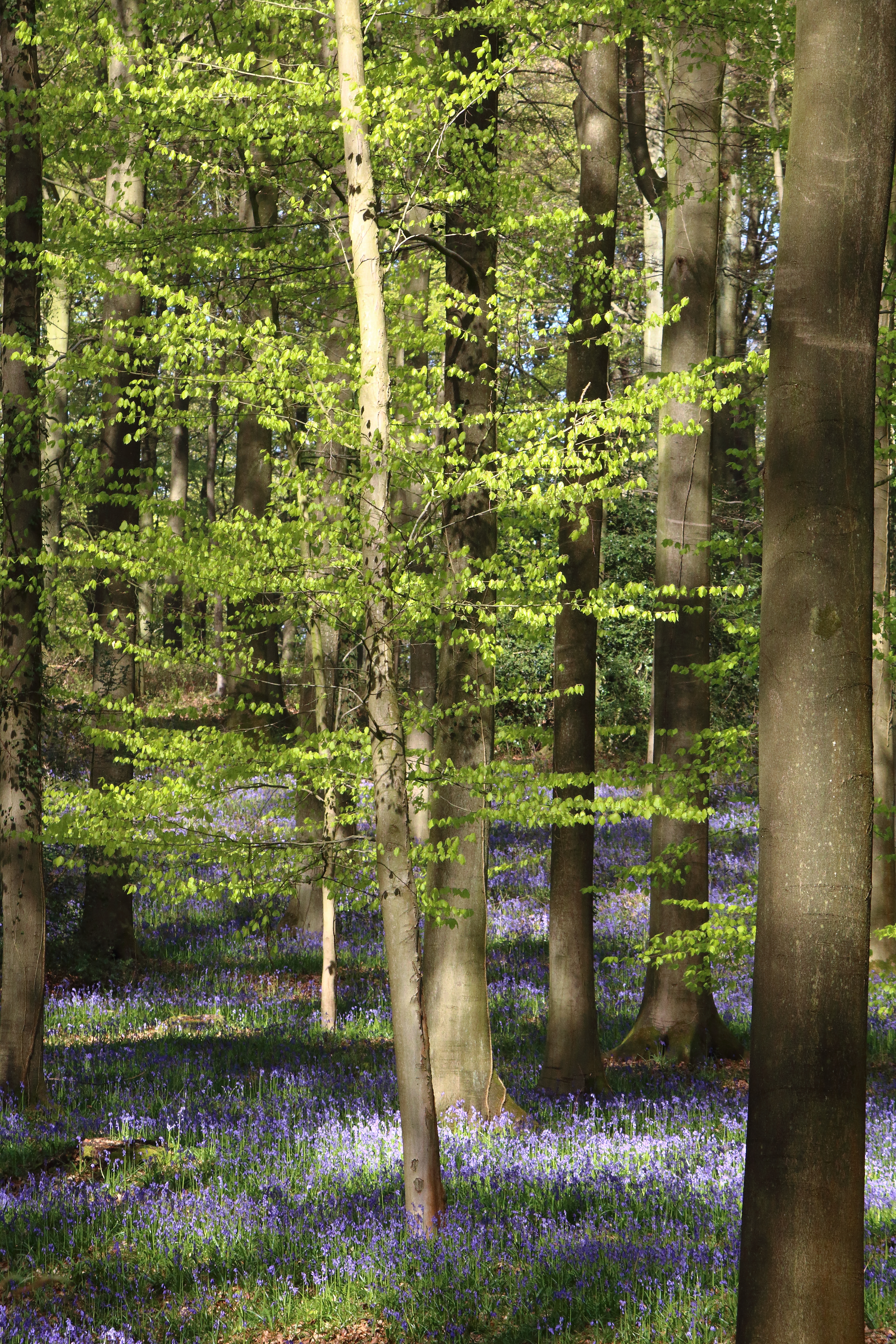
Brakelbos bluebell woods

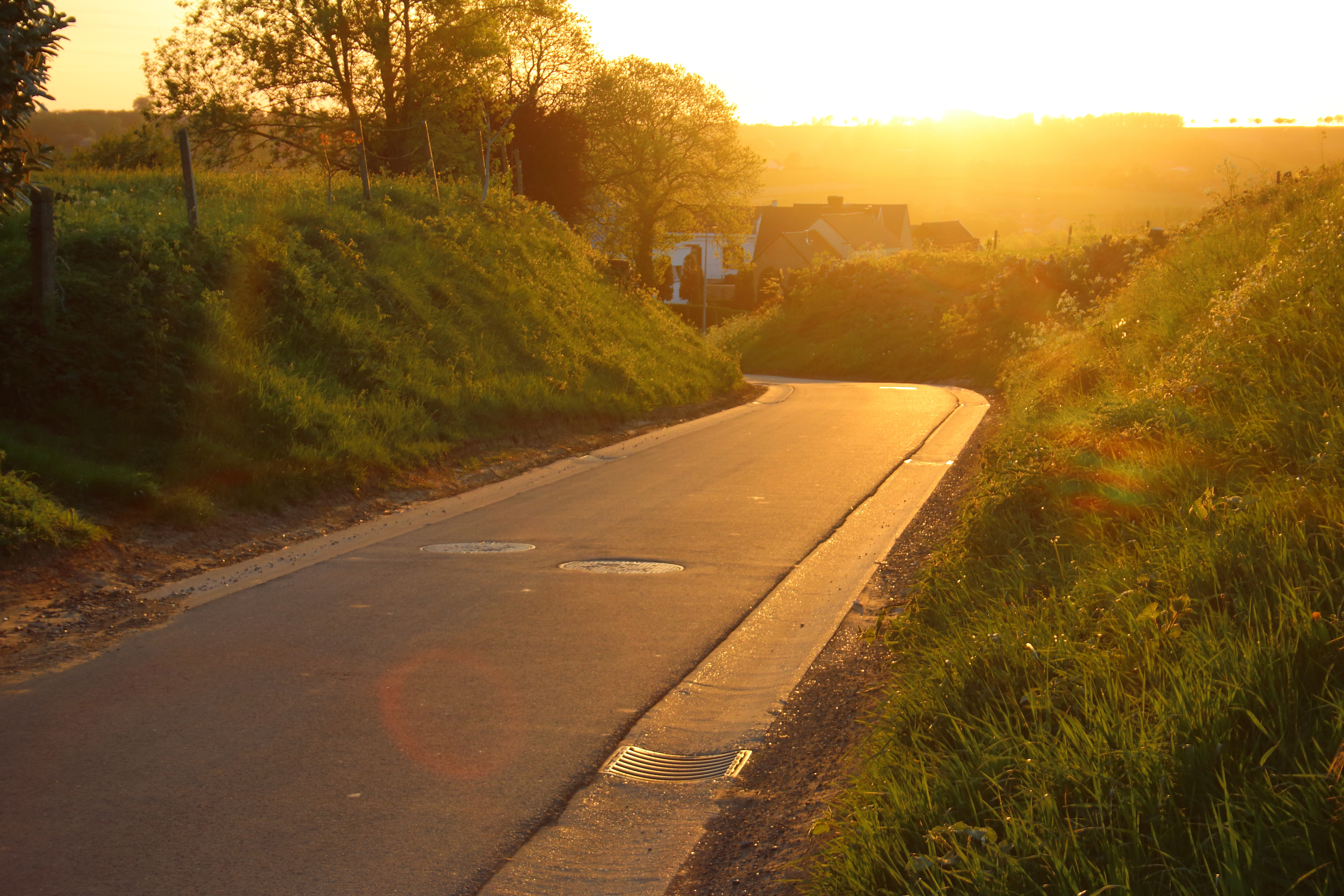
Berendries

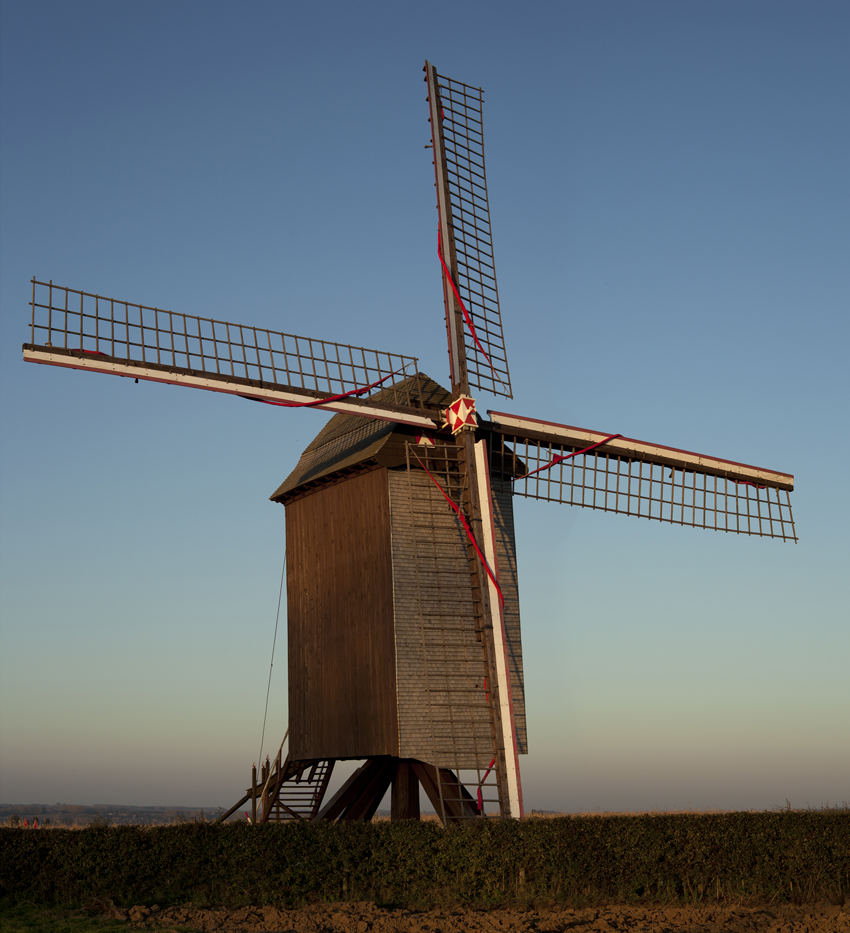
Tissenhove windmill

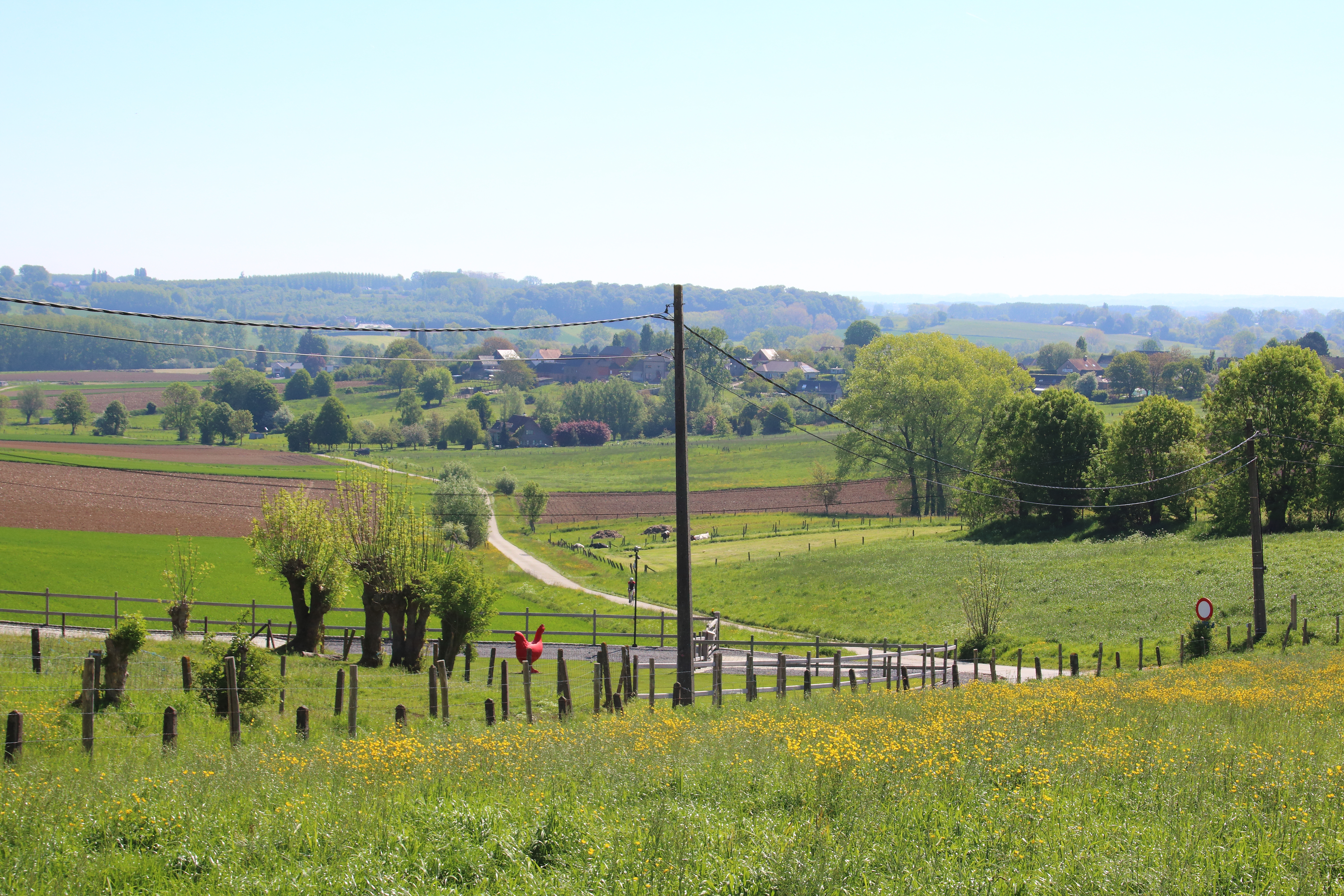
hilly countryside in Brakel

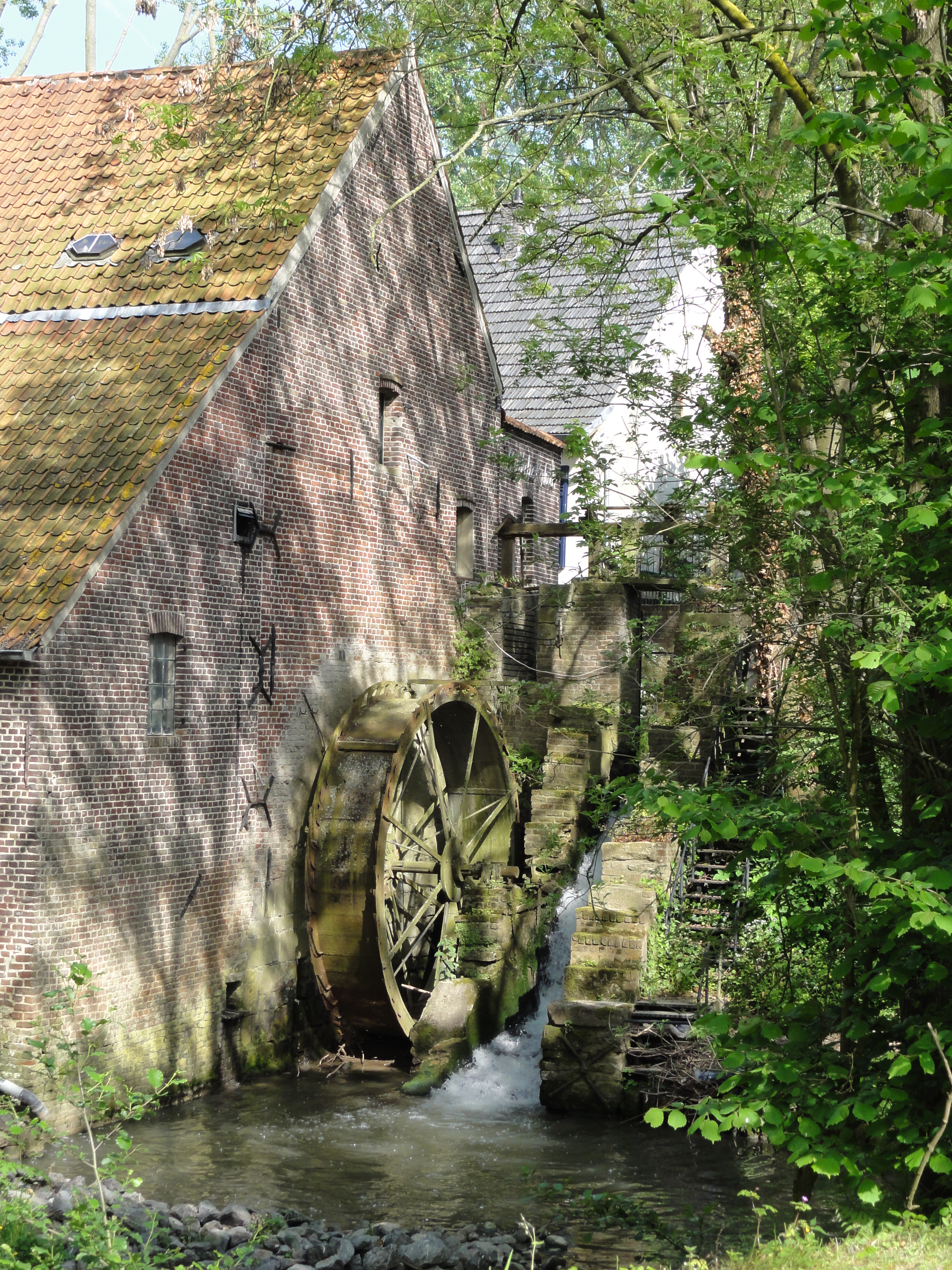
Moldergem watermill

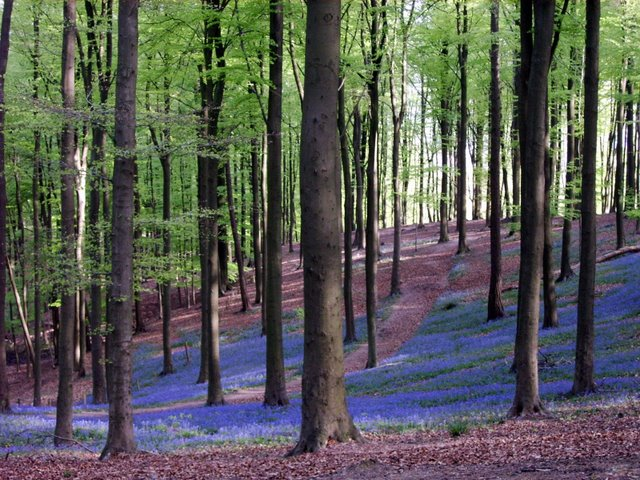
Muziekbos bluebell woods

== See also ==
- Raspaillebos
