= Bambrugge =

- Village
- Erpe-Mere in East-Flanders
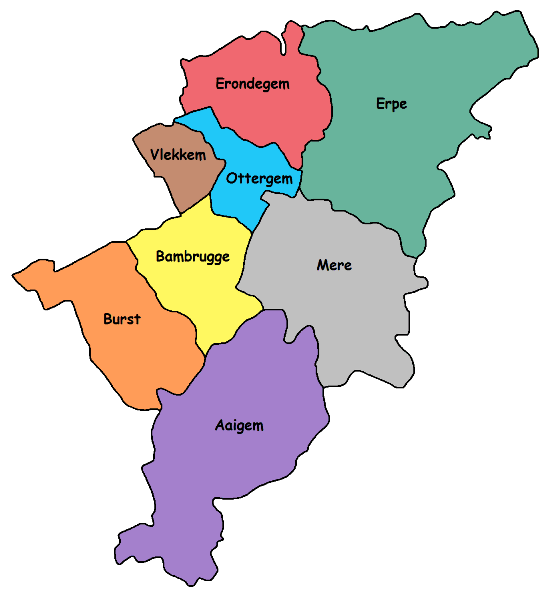
- Localisation of Bambrugge in Erpe-Mere

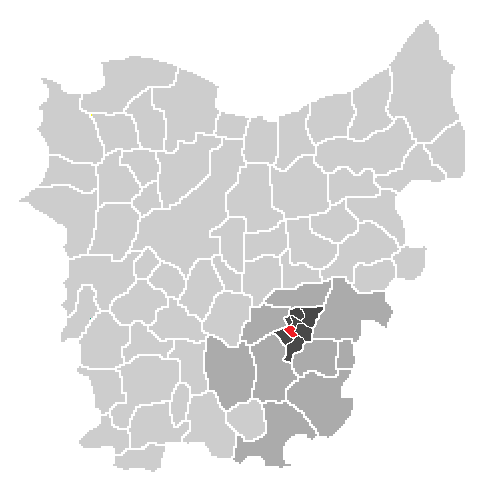
- Localisation of Bambrugge in the community of Erpe-Mere in the arrondissement of Aalst in the province of East-Flanders.
- Country: Belgium
- Region: Flanders
- Province: East Flanders
- Arrondissement: Aalst
- Municipality: Erpe-Mere

Area
  - Total: 2.89 km^{2} (1.12 sq mi)
- Elevation: 34 m (112 ft)

Population (2003)
  - Total: 1,575
  - Density: 545/km^{2} (1,410/sq mi)
- Source: NIS
- Postal code: 9420

Bambrugge is a sub-municipality of Erpe-Mere in Flanders. It is located on the Molenbeek in the Denderstreek, southeast of East Flanders and belongs to the Arrondissement of Aalst. It is bordered by the sub-municipalities of Vlekkem, Ottergem, Mere, Aaigem and Burst and the municipality of Sint-Lievens-Houtem (sub-municipality Zonnegem). Bambrugge has 1575 inhabitants as of 1 January 2003 and has an area of 2.89 km. The population density is 545 inhabitants / km ². Bambrugge has also a hamlet: Egem.

== History ==
Bambrugge was part of the village Burst until 1803. A census in 1893 reported that the village had 872 inhabitants. Bambrugge was mentioned several times in the Middle Ages. The name probably derives from the so-called banmolens (banmolen meaning compulsion mill). In these mills serfs were obliged to grind their corn. Another possibility is that the name is derived from the word "baan" (baan meaning way or road) or is a corruption of Banbrugge (Bridge of Banno, with brug meaning bridge).

== Domain Steenberg ==
The Romans knew that there was white natural stone in Steenberg in Bambrugge, called Vlaamse Arduin or Lediaanse Steen. This white natural stone was suitable as a foundation for the masonry of Roman villas and as building material for columns and capitals of the Roman temples. By the 11th or 12th century white sandstone was extracted in Bambrugge (Steenberg). Extraction continued until after World War II. It is the administrative center of Erpe-Mere.

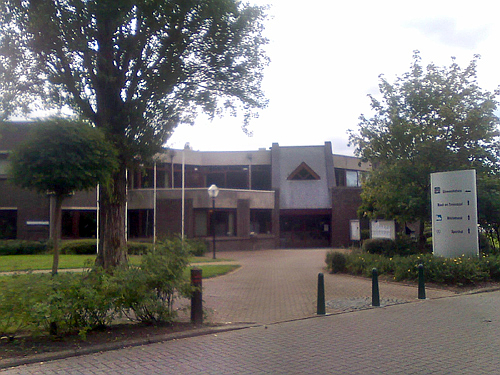
The town hall of Erpe-Mere, at Steenberg in Bambrugge

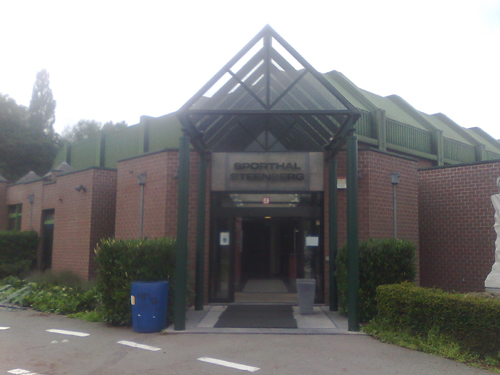
The sports hall of Erpe-Mere, at Steenberg in Bambrugge

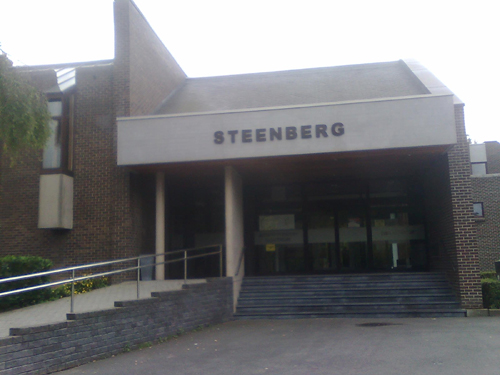
The library of Erpe-Mere, at Steenberg in Bambrugge

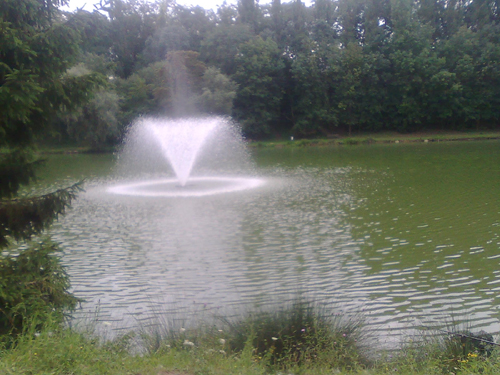
The pool of Steenberg in Bambrugge

== Landmarks ==
=== Mills ===
There are two water mills in Bambrugge, both located on the Molenbeek Brook: the Egemmolen and the Molens Van Sande. The Egemmolen has been largely demolished, but there are still remains of this mill and the mill house intact.

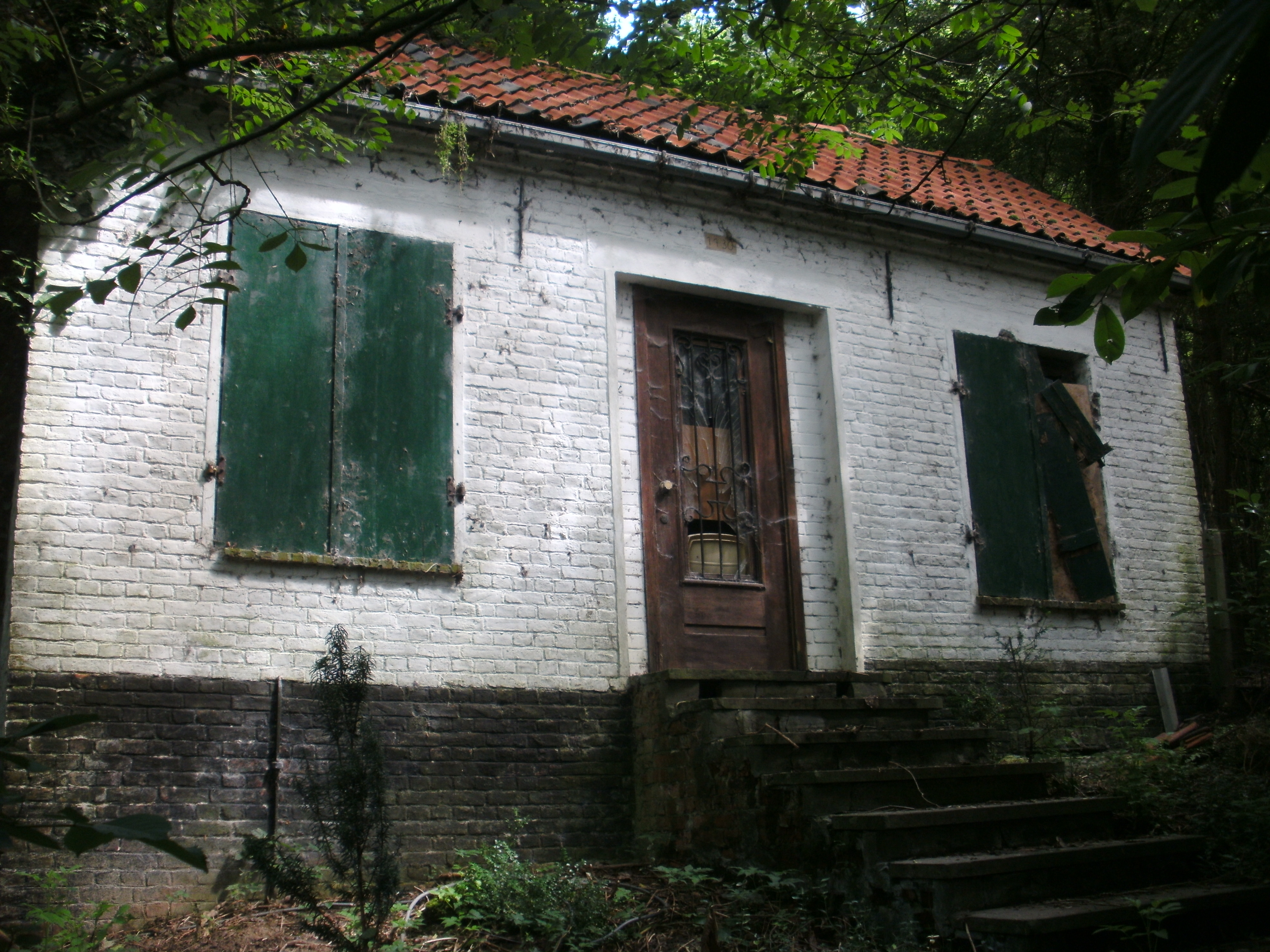
Mill house of the Egemmolen at Bambrugge

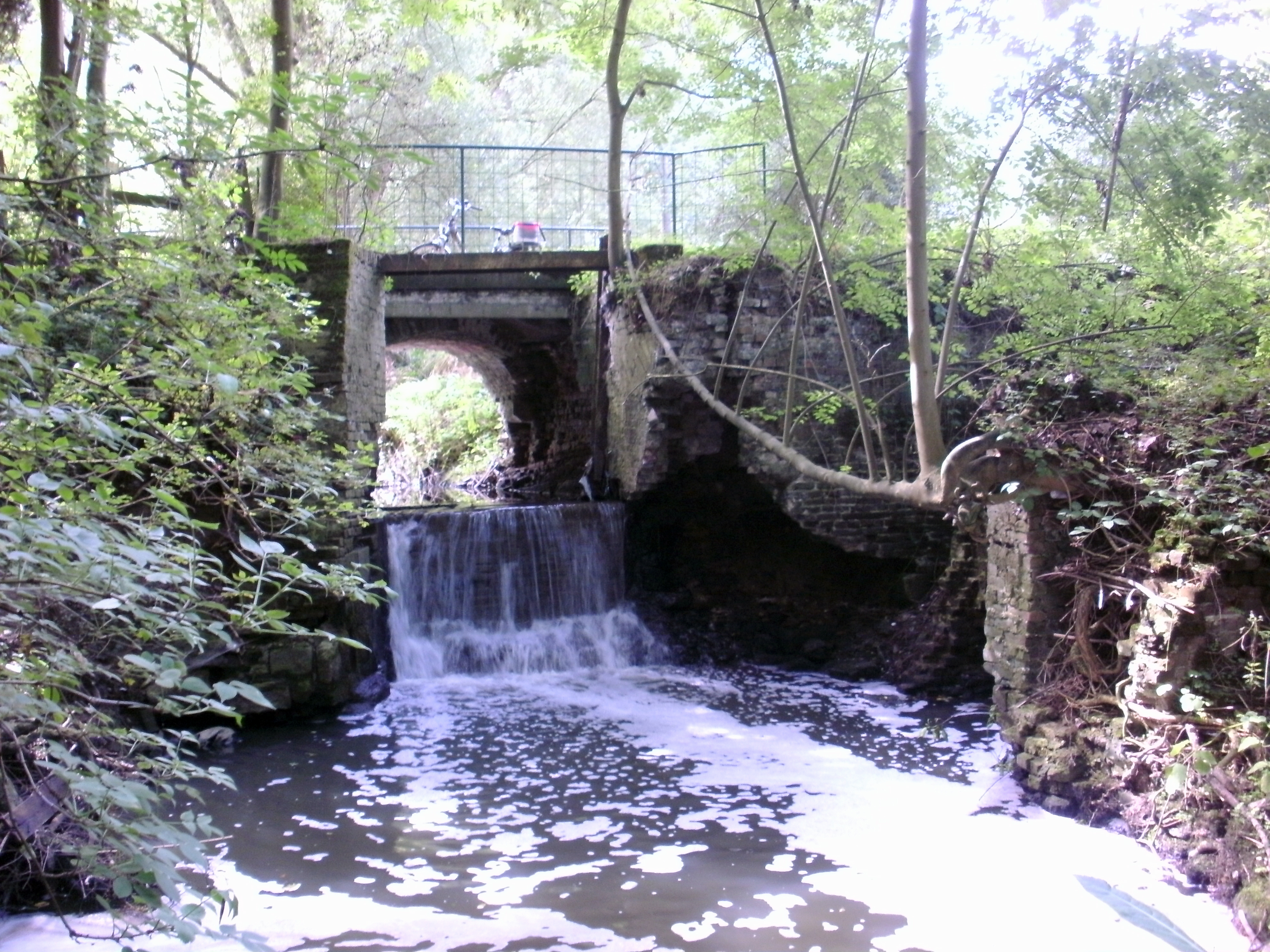
Remains of the Egemmolen at Bambrugge

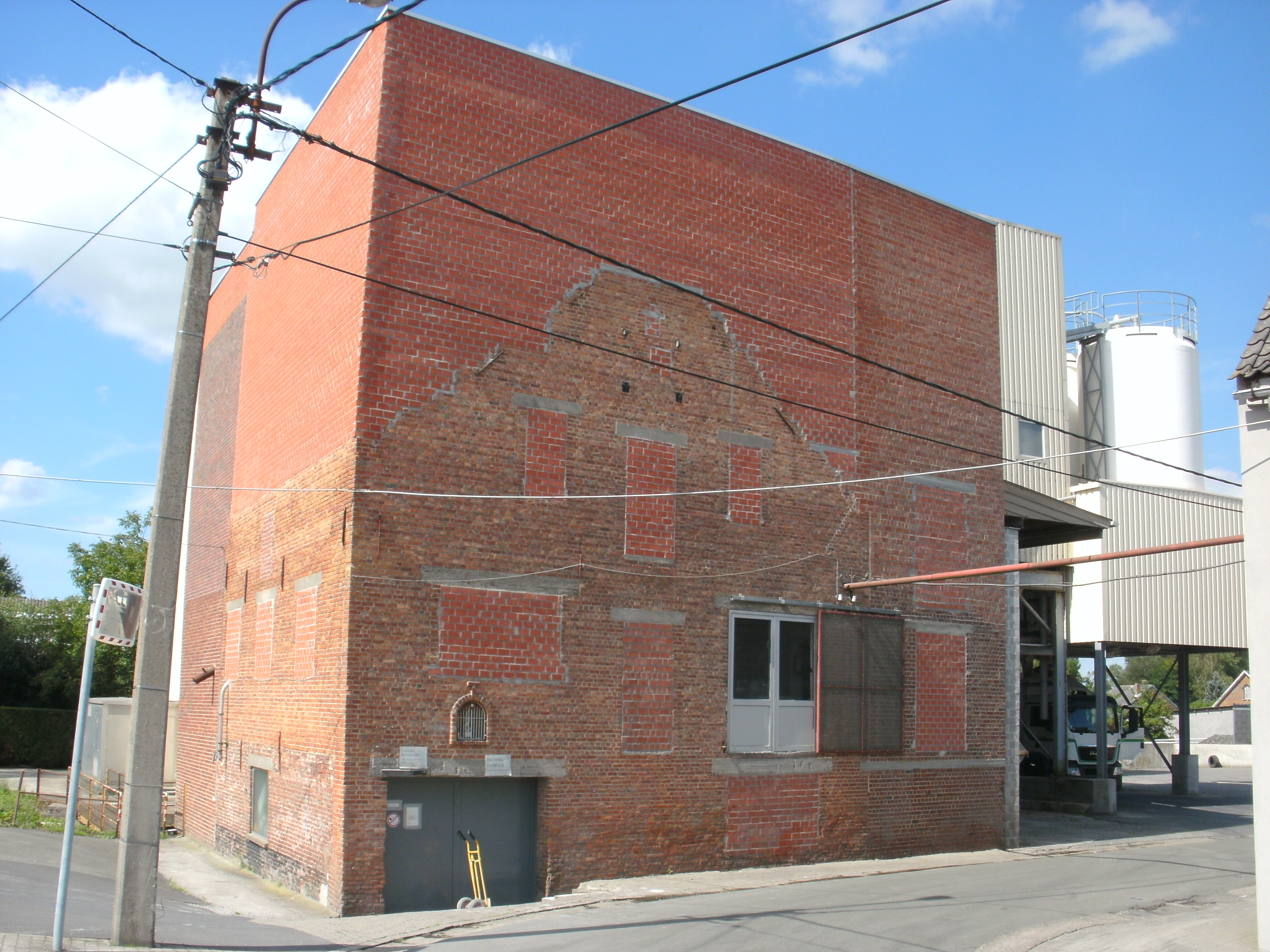
Front view of the Molens Van Sande at Bambrugge

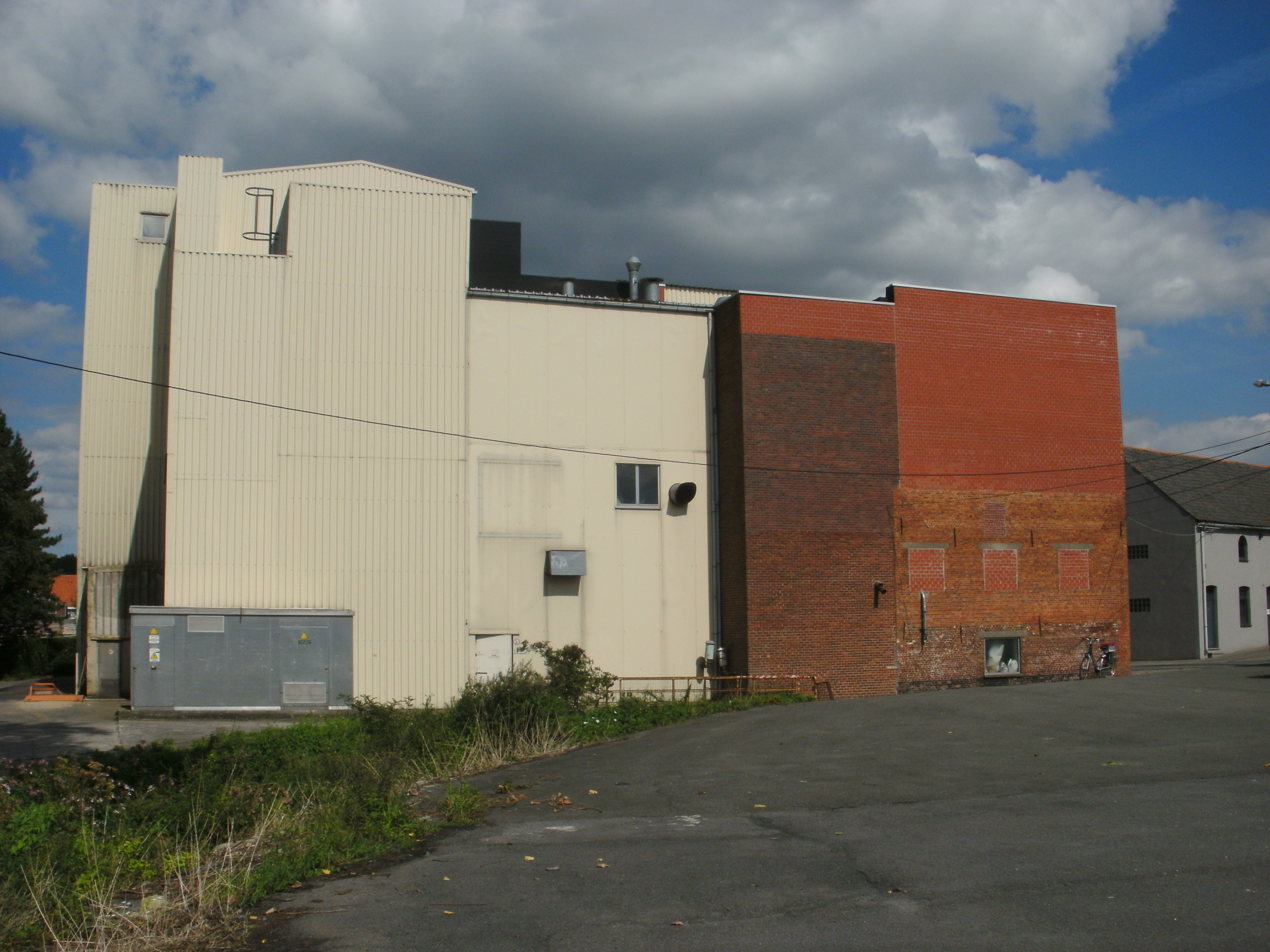
Side-view of the Molens Van Sande at Bambrugge

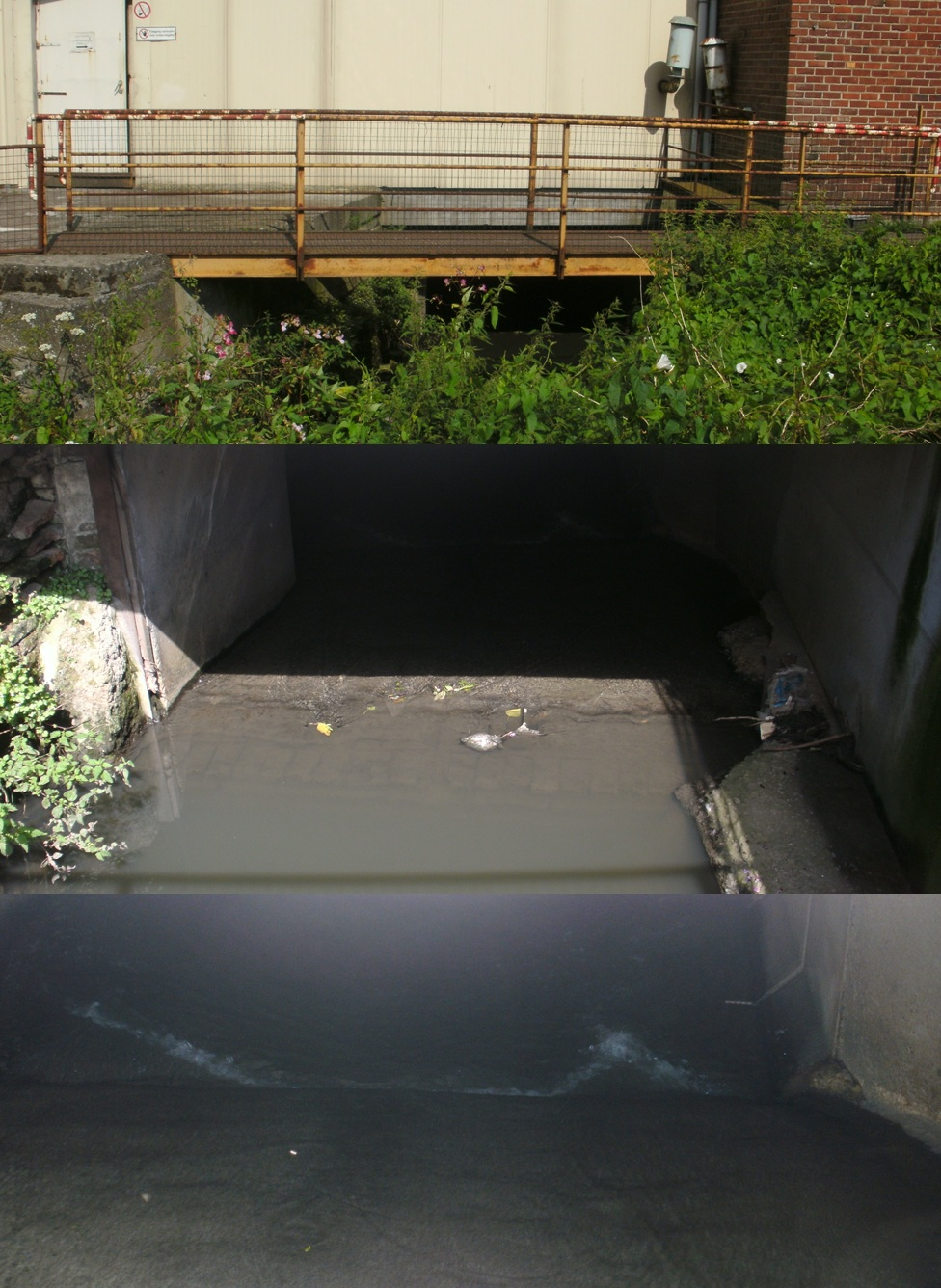
Place where the mill wheel of the Molens Van Sande once was at Bambrugge

Name(s)	Address	Type	Protected	Info
Egemmolen; Meuleken Tik Tak	Everdal 21	Overshot watermill	No	Wheat mill The mill wheel has been removed and the mill largely demolished The mill house is now used as a country cottage
Molens Van Sande; Kasteelmolen; Celindermolen	Prinsdaal 33	Overshot watermill	No	It was originally a wheat mill and a compulsion mill Later on it was just a wheat mill The mill wheel has been removed It is now an industrial flour mill

=== Church and chappelles ===
The Sint-Martinus Church can be found in Bambrugge, with Bambrugge belonging to the deanery of Lede. As of 2012, there are still six chapels and a cave in good condition. Previously, there were at least eight chapels, with the two chapels that were not in the possession of the church having been demolished to make room for a house. The old church bell has been preserved and is located in the presbytery of Bambrugge. The former morgue of Bambrugge is renovated in 2012.

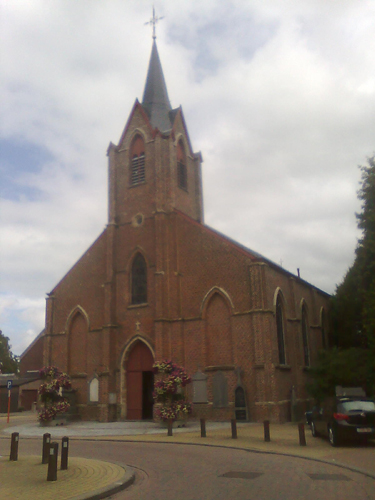
The church of Bambrugge

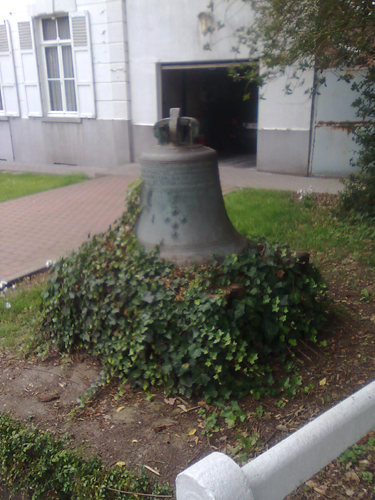
The old church clock of Bambrugge

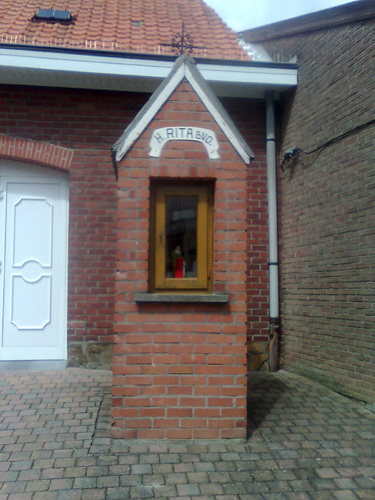
The little chappelle at Bambruggedorp

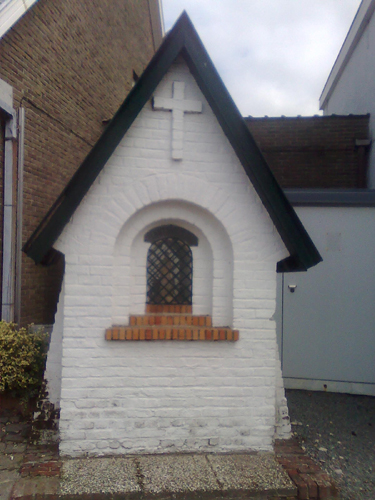
The little chappelle at Dries

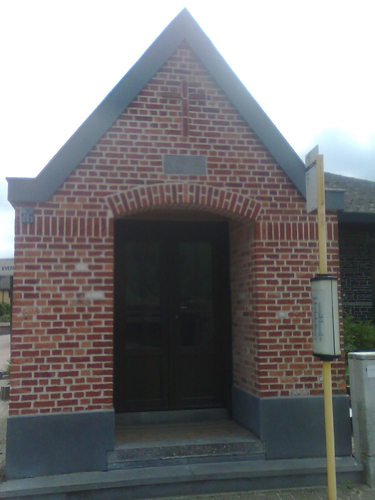
The little chappelle at Egemstraat

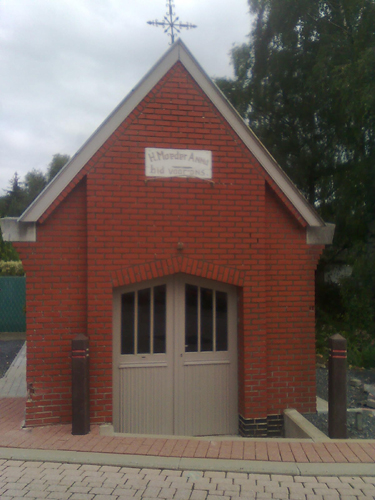
The little chappelle at Katstraat

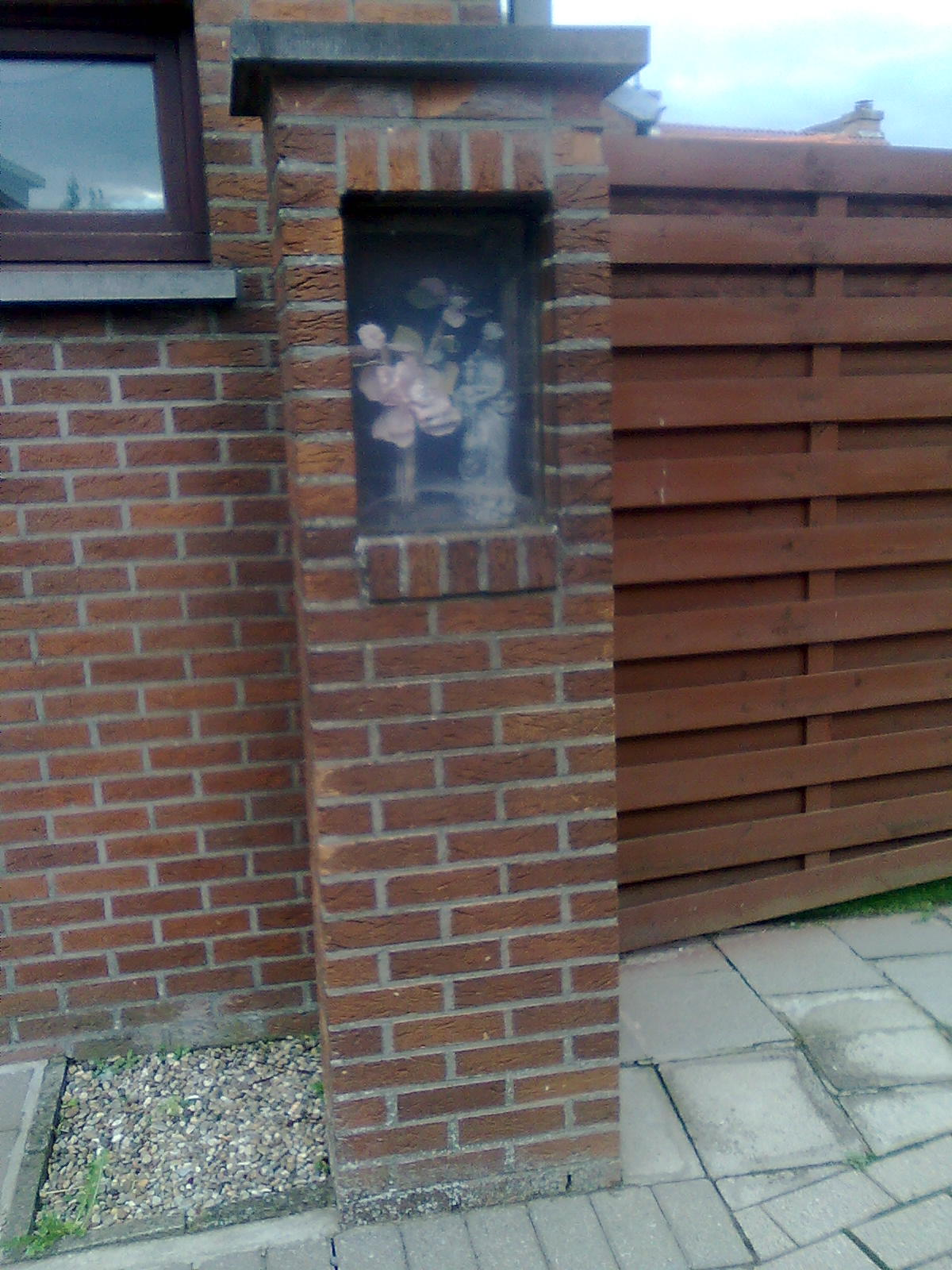
The little chappelle at Kwalestraat

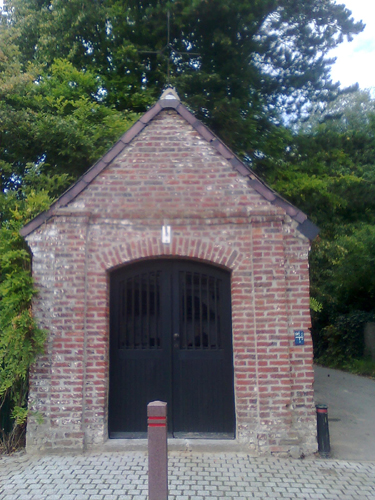
The little chappelle at Landsheerstraat

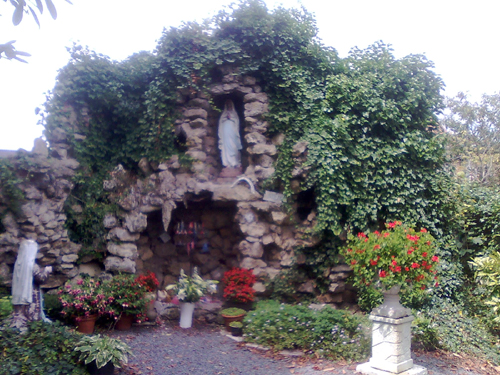
The cave of Bambrugge

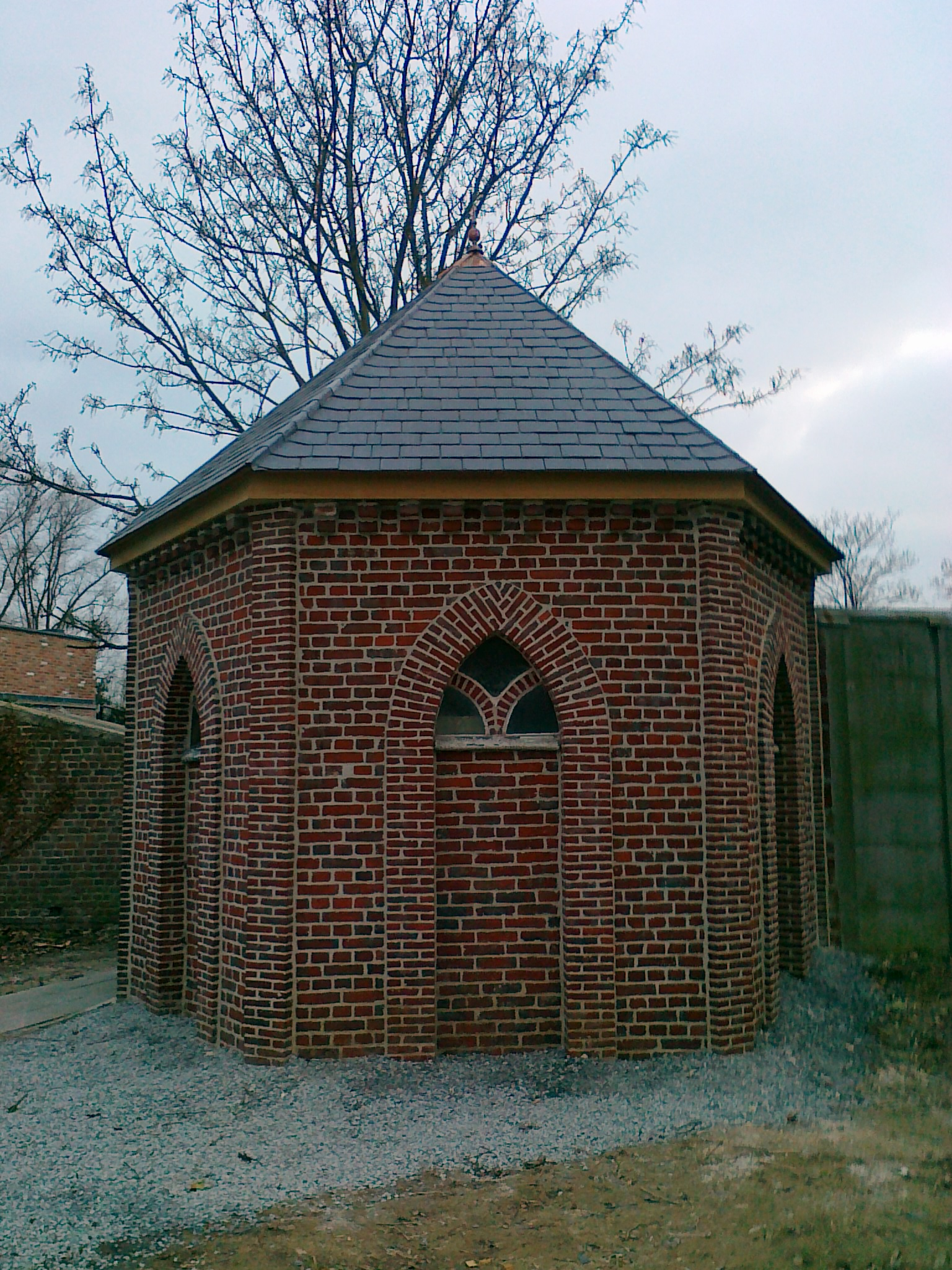
The morgue of Bambrugge

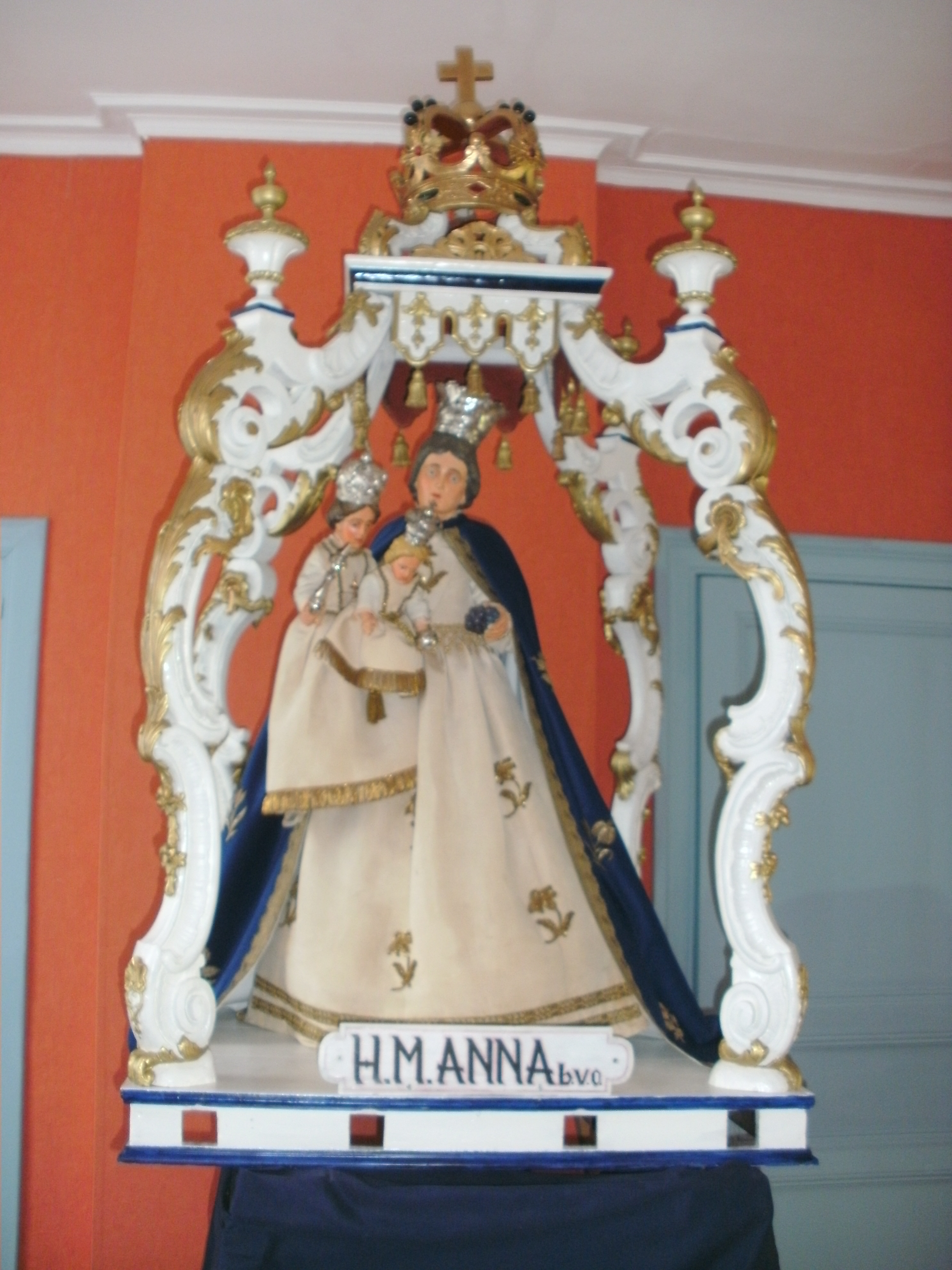
Saint Anne Statue

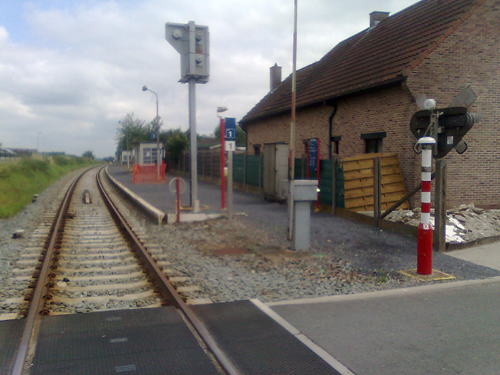
The station of Bambrugge

== Events ==
In the week around 26 July there is a fair in Bambrugge and the Saint Anne Statue is carried around in its procession. Each year, the Steenbergcross (cross-country race) and the Molenrock (rock festival) are held at Steenberg in Bambrugge.

== Tourism ==
Through Bambrugge runs the Molenbeekroute. The Molenbeekroute is a cycle track network, known primarily for the mills of the municipality Erpe-Mere and two brooks that are located there, with both having the name Molenbeek (mill brook).

== Sports ==
The football club KRC Bambrugge plays in Bambrugge, and is active in the first provincial league of the province of East Flanders.

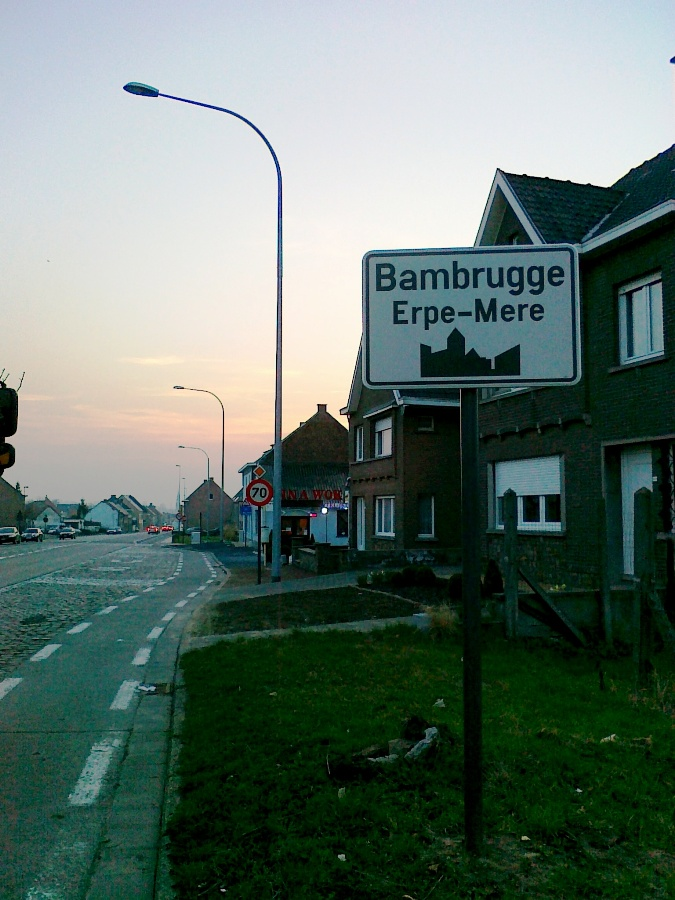
Town sign: the speed limit of 50 km/h in Bambrugge

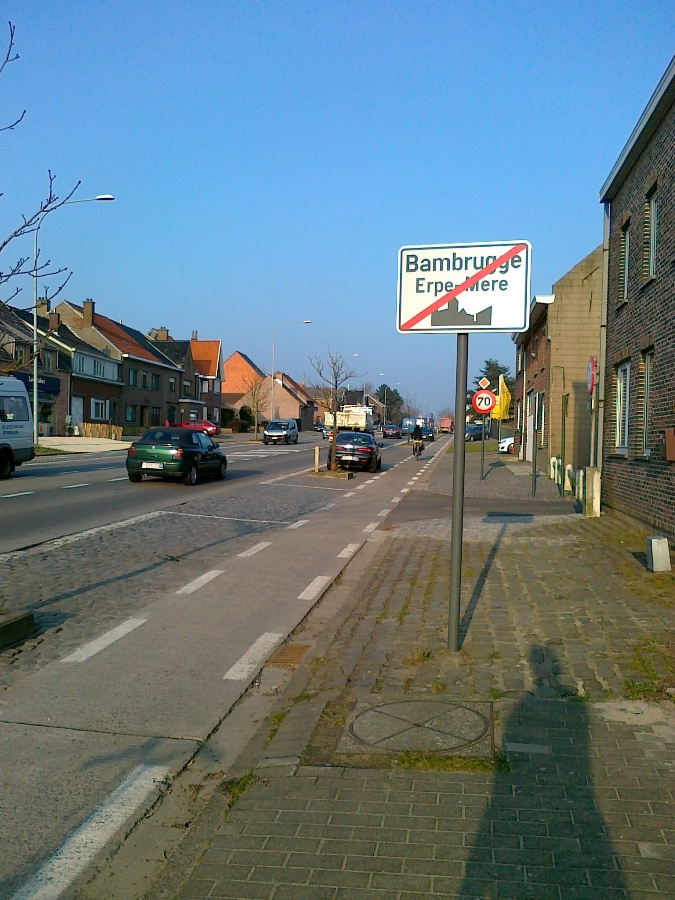
Town sign: no speed limit of 50 km/h any more in Bambrugge
