= Leeuwergem =

- Village
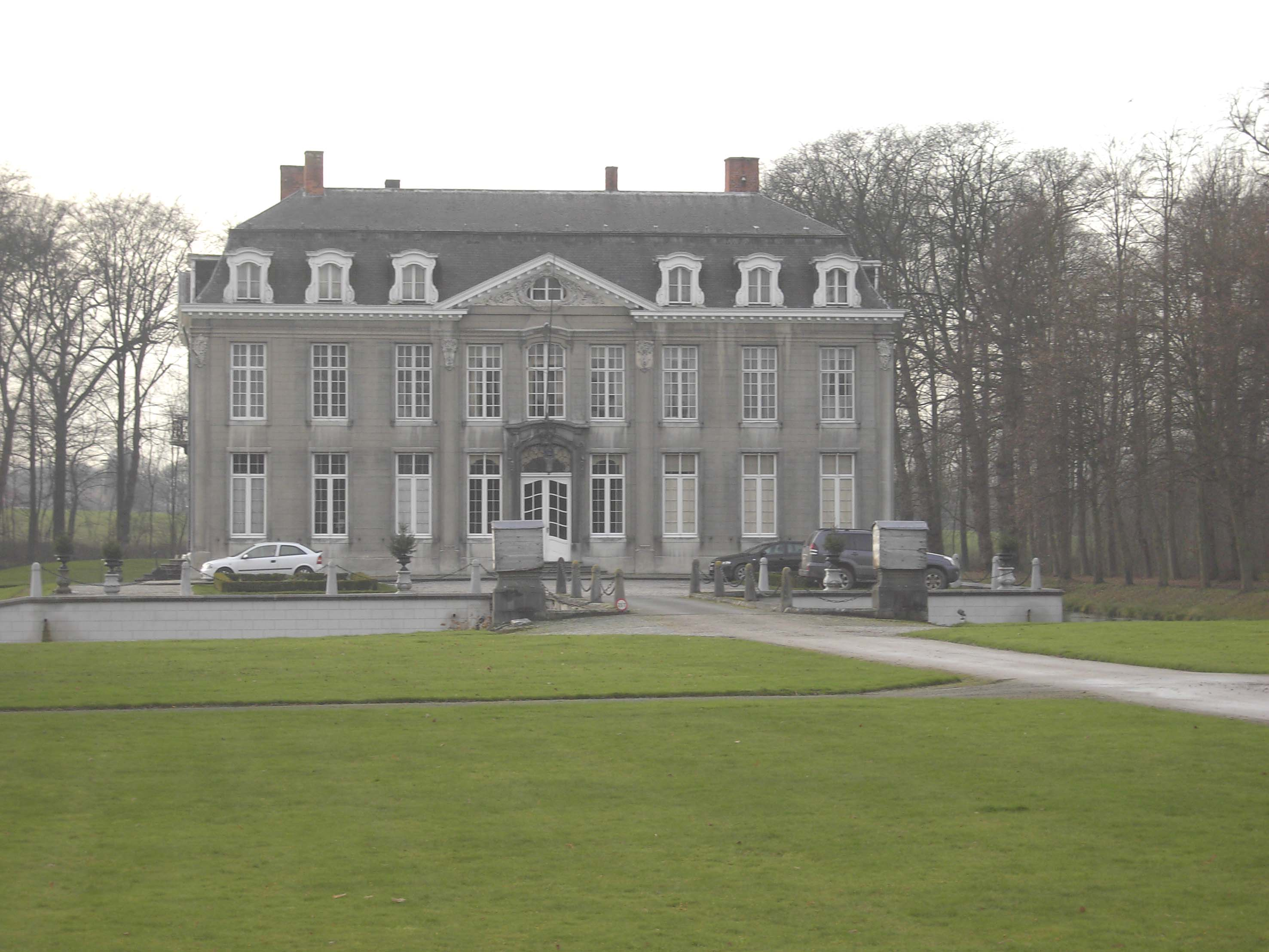
- Leeuwergem Castle (2008)

- Location in Belgium
- Coordinates: 50°53′N 3°49′E
- Country: Belgium
- Region: Flemish Region
- Province: East Flanders
- Municipality: Zottegem

Area
  - Total: 2.49 km^{2} (0.96 sq mi)

Population (2021)
  - Total: 1,776
  - Density: 713/km^{2} (1,850/sq mi)
- Time zone: CET

Leeuwergem is a village within the municipality of Zottegem. It is located on the Molenbeek, within the Denderstreek and Flemish Ardennes, a hilly region in the southern part of the East Flanders province, Belgium.

Leeuwergem was formerly part of the heerlijkheid of Zottegem. From 1271 onwards, it formed a heerlijkheid with Massemen. It was an independent municipality until 1970, when it was merged into Zottegem.

Leeuwergem and the neighbouring village of Elene are home to the 18th-century Leeuwergem Castle domain, a private estate spanning 32 hectares.

== Gallery ==
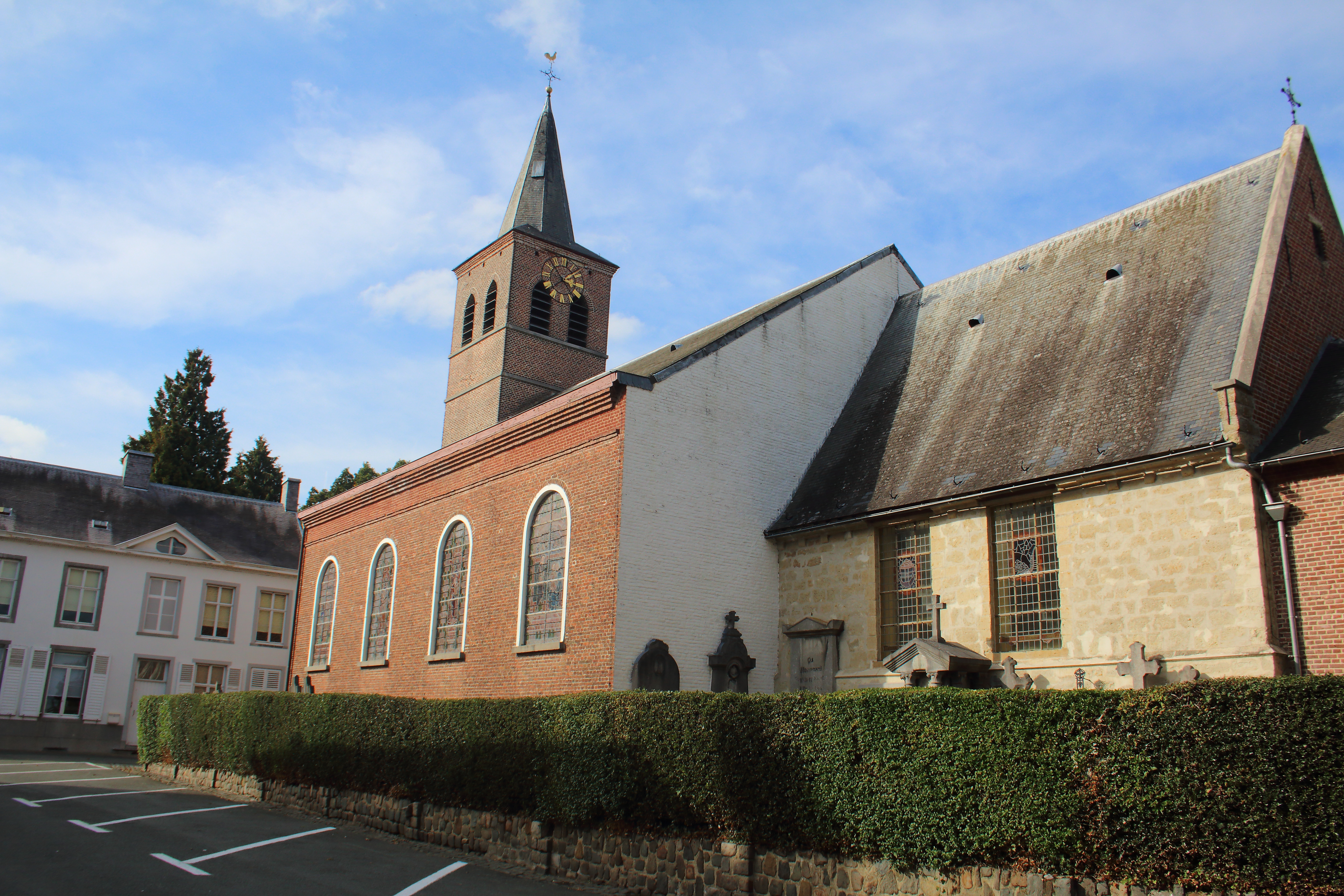
View on the St Amandus Church

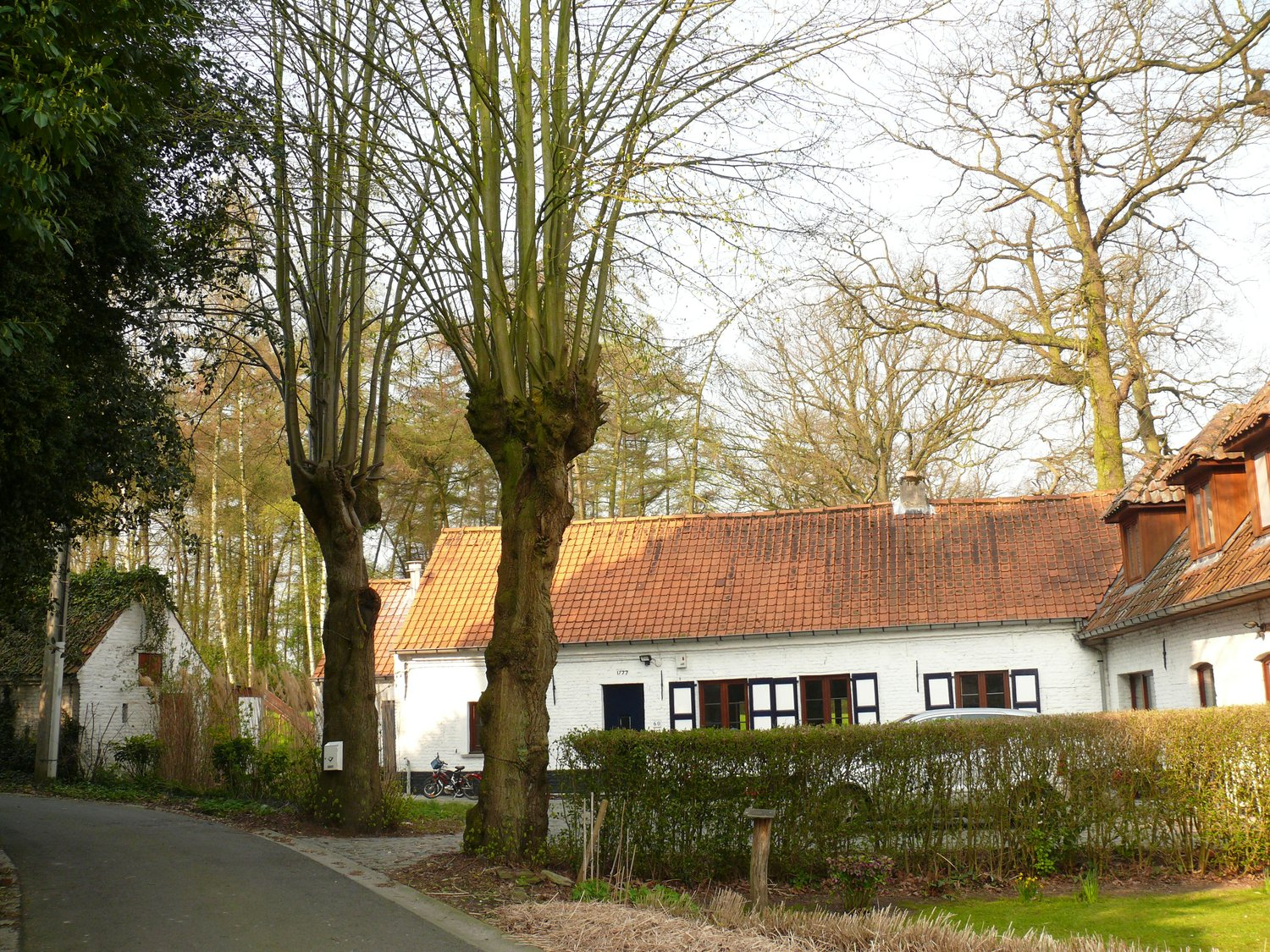
Farm in Leeuwergem

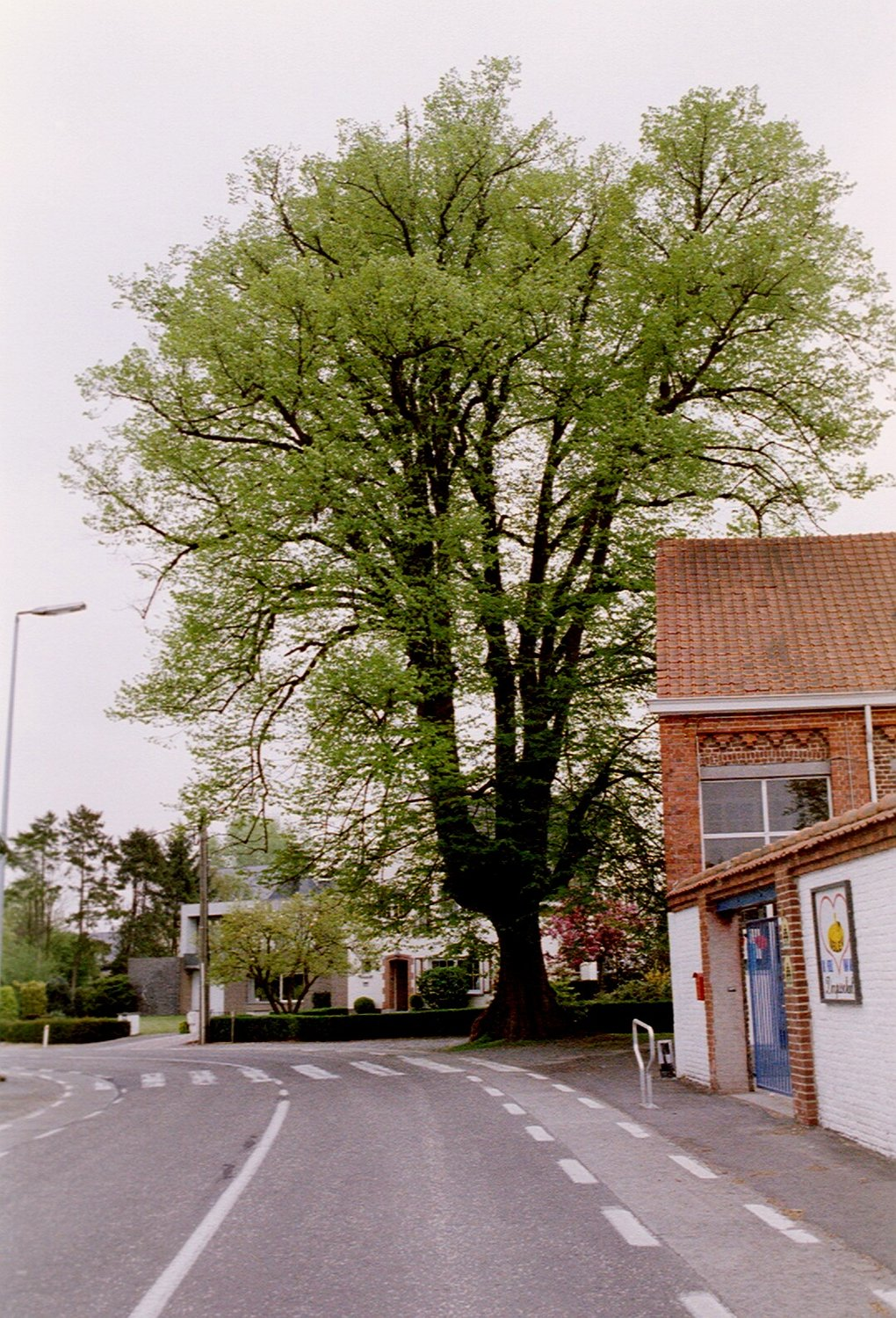
Seven sacraments tree

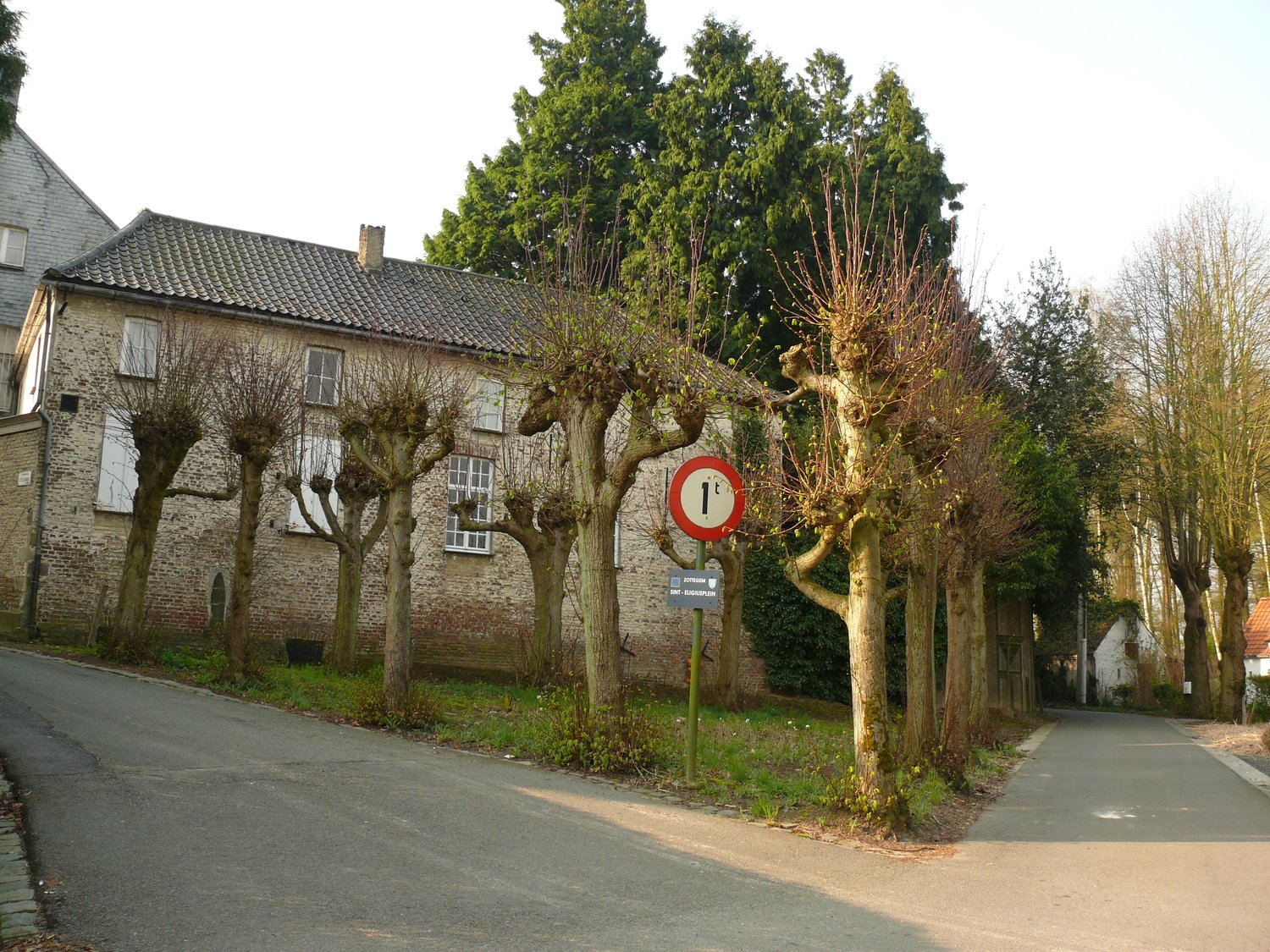
House in Leeuwergem
