= Egem =

- Hamlet
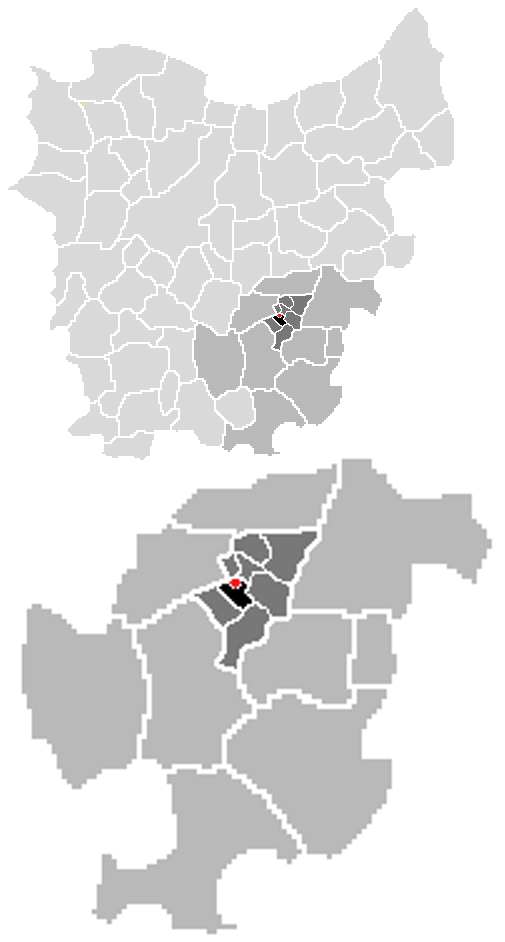
- Localisation of Egem, the sub-municipality of Bambrugge, the community of Erpe-Mere and the arrondissement of Aalst in the province of East-Flanders.

- Location within Belgium
- Coordinates: 50°55′N 3°56′E
- Country: Belgium
- Region: Flanders
- Province: East Flanders
- Arrondissement: Aalst
- Municipality: Erpe-Mere
- Sub-municipality: Bambrugge
- Postal code: 9420
- Area code: 053

Egem is a hamlet in the sub-municipality of Bambrugge in the municipality of Erpe-Mere in Flanders, Belgium. It is located on the Molenbeek, in the Denderstreek, within the southeast of East Flanders and belongs to the Arrondissement of Aalst. It is bordered by the sub-municipalities of Bambrugge proper, Vlekkem (municipality of Erpe-Mere), Ottergem (municipality of Erpe-Mere) and Zonnegem (municipality of Sint-Lievens-Houtem). Egem also borders the domain Steenberg. Egem consists of two streets, the Egemstraat and Everdal.

== History ==
Through the centuries, Egem has had multiple names. In the oldest documents it was found to be named Heddeghem (1571), later it was also mentioned as Edeghem (1629), Hettegem (1638), Eedegem (1763), Eghem (1779) and Eegem (1842).

Etymologically, Flemish toponyms ending with –gem refer to a Germanic compound of –haim, meaning ‘home’ or ‘residence’, and a derivative ending –inga. The first part of the name "Egem" is commonly assigned to the Germanic name of Haid, Hait or Heit. In its totality, the compound Haidingahaim meant ‘residence of the followers or tribal members of Frank Haid’, degenerated into Heddeghem. The locality name belongs to the group of ingahemnames who are older than regular hemnames. Egem was founded in the early centuries of the Merovingian era (6th-7th century), and thus has an older origin than Bambrugge. Egem was probably a secluded homestead which was not too great, and was later absorbed by the rapidly faster developing Bambrugge.

== Location ==
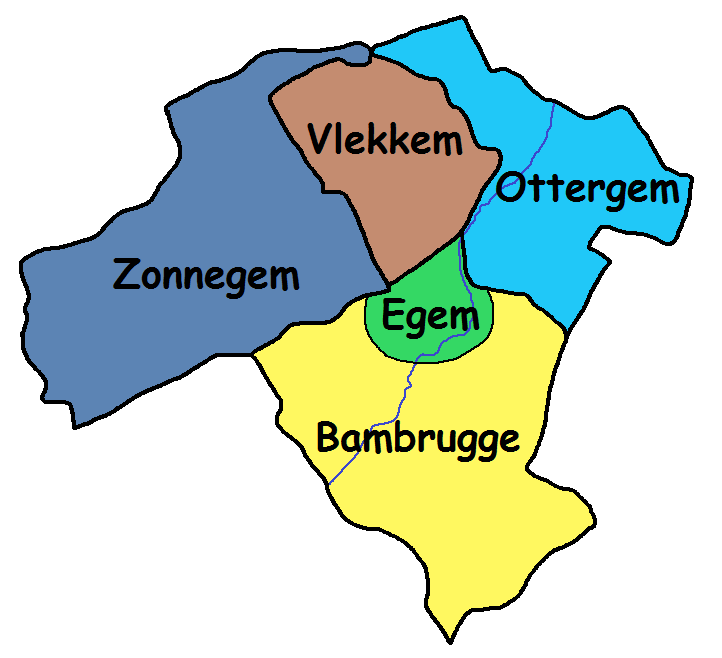
Localisation of Egem in Bambrugge and the surrounding sub-municipalities

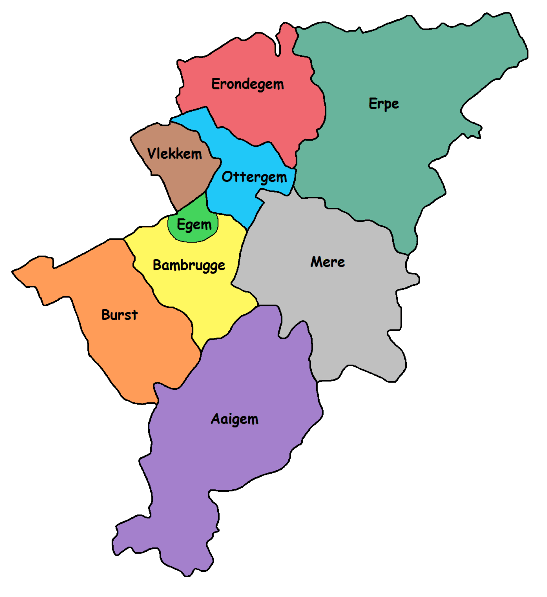
Localisation of Egem in Erpe-Mere

== Landmarks ==
- The Egemmolen or Meuleken Tik Tak was an overshot watermill at Everdal 21 and functioned as a wheat mill. The mill wheel has been removed and the mill has been largely demolished, but there are still remains of this mill and the mill house intact. The mill house is now used as a country cottage.
- The little chappelle at Egemstraat
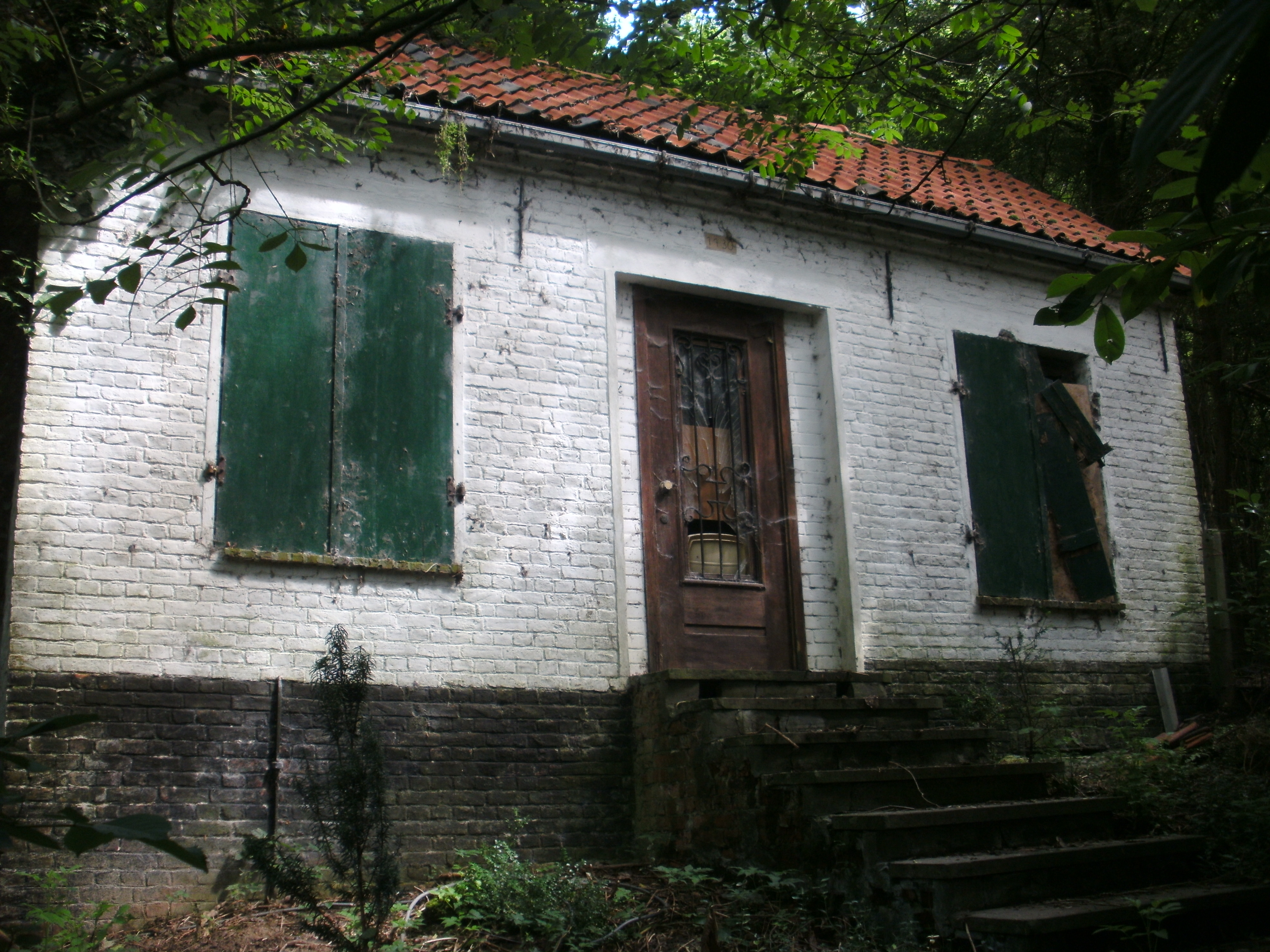
Mill house of the Egemmolen at Bambrugge

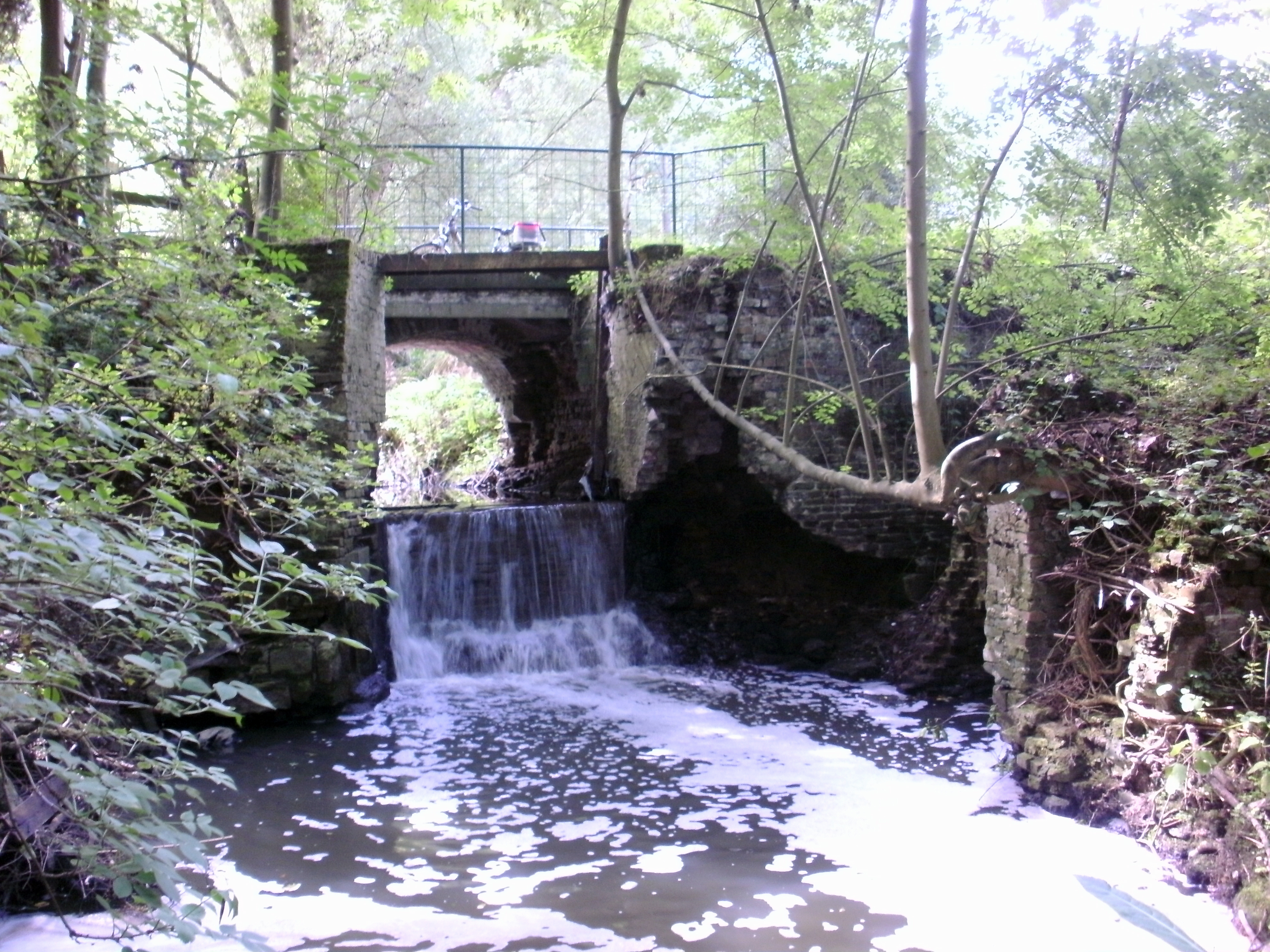
Remains of the Egemmolen watermill at Bambrugge

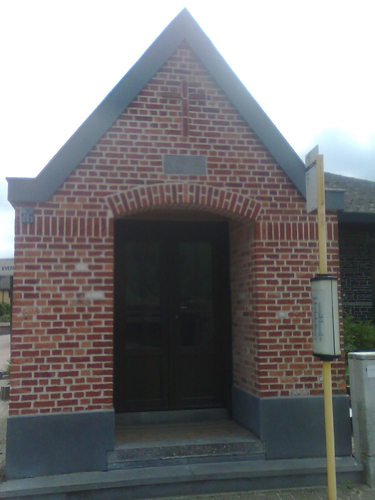
The little chappelle at Egemstraat
