= Vlekkem =

Coordinates: 50°56′N 3°56′E

- Village
- Erpe-Mere in East-Flanders
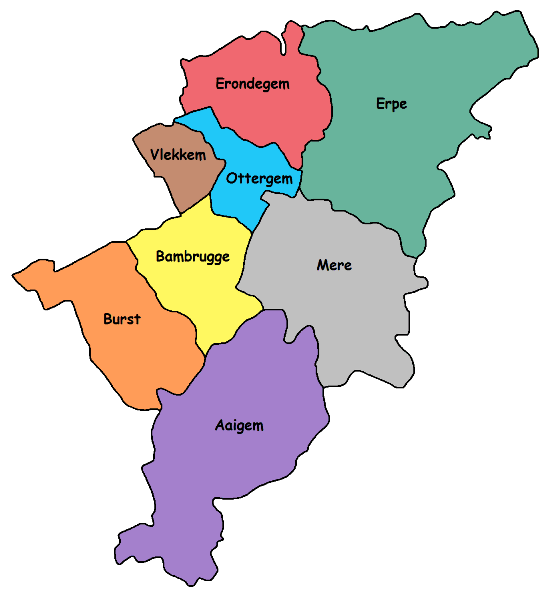
- Localisation of Vlekkem in Erpe-Mere

- Coat of arms

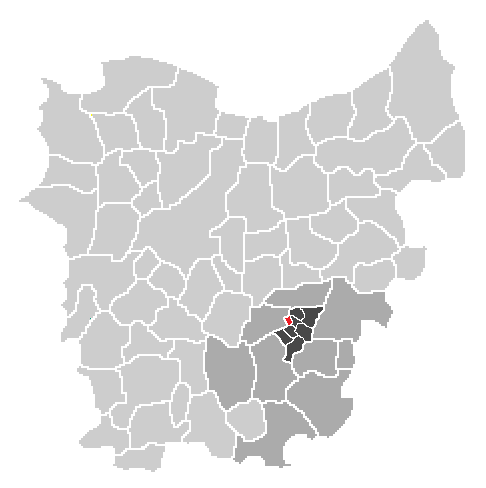
- Localisation of Vlekkem in the community of Erpe-Mere in the arrondissement of Aalst in the province of East-Flanders.
- Country: Belgium
- Region: Flanders
- Province: East Flanders
- Arrondissement: Aalst
- Municipality: Erpe-Mere

Area
  - Total: 1.22 km^{2} (0.47 sq mi)
- Elevation: 0 m (0 ft)

Population (2003)
  - Total: 292
  - Density: 240/km^{2} (620/sq mi)
- Source: NIS
- Postal code: 9420

Vlekkem is a sub-municipality of Erpe-Mere in Flanders, Belgium. It is located on the Molenbeek in the Denderstreek, southeast of East Flanders and belongs to the Arrondissement of Aalst. The sub-municipality is bordered by the hamlet Egem of the sub-municipality Bambrugge, the sub-municipality Ottergem and the municipality Sint-Lievens-Houtem (sub-municipalities Vlierzele and Zonnegem). Vlekkem has 292 inhabitants as of 1 January 2003 and an area of 1.22 km. The population density is 240 inhabitants / km^{2}.

== Vlekkem ==
Vlekkem was first mentioned in an official document in 1036. In this charter where the emperor Koenraad II recognized the Abbey Sint-Pietersabdij in Ghent and their possessions, they spoke of "et in Bursinghem et terram in Ottringhem et terram in Flachem". In the year 1209 they spoke of Vleckem. In the opinion of the historian Föstermann, the name of the village is derived from a personal name. At the end of the 18th century, Vlekkem had 55 houses and 275 inhabitants.

== Landmarks ==
Sint-Lambertus Church is located in Vlekkem. Vlekkem belongs to deanery of Lede.

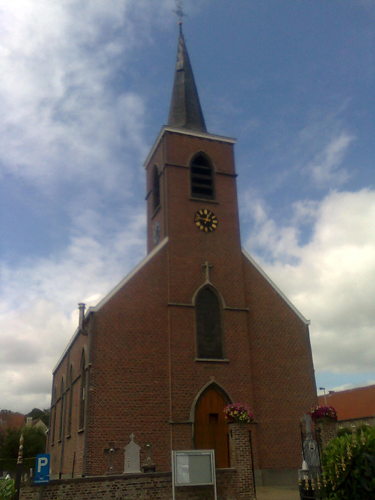
The church of Vlekkem

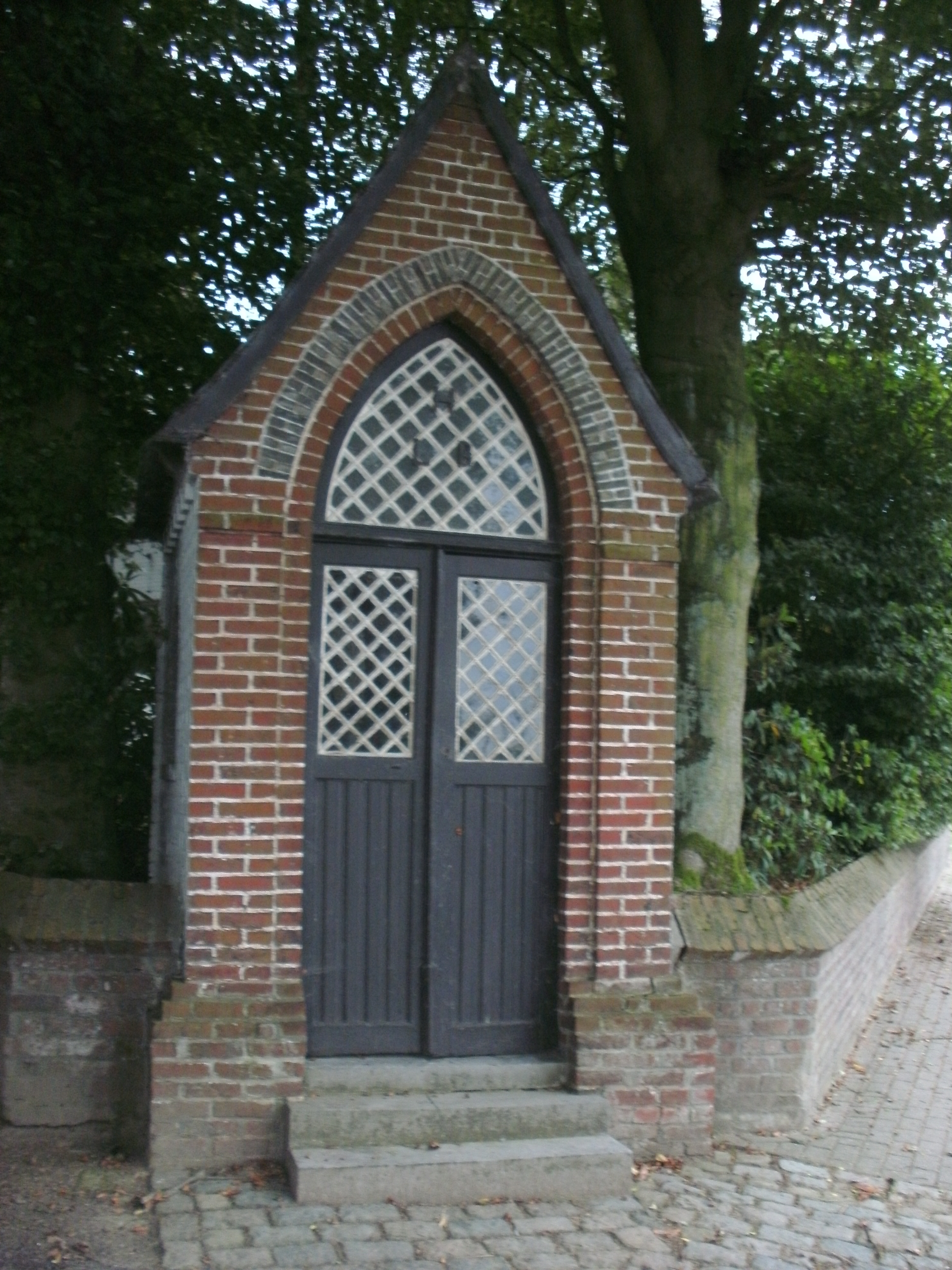
The little chappelle at Keerstraat in Vlekkem

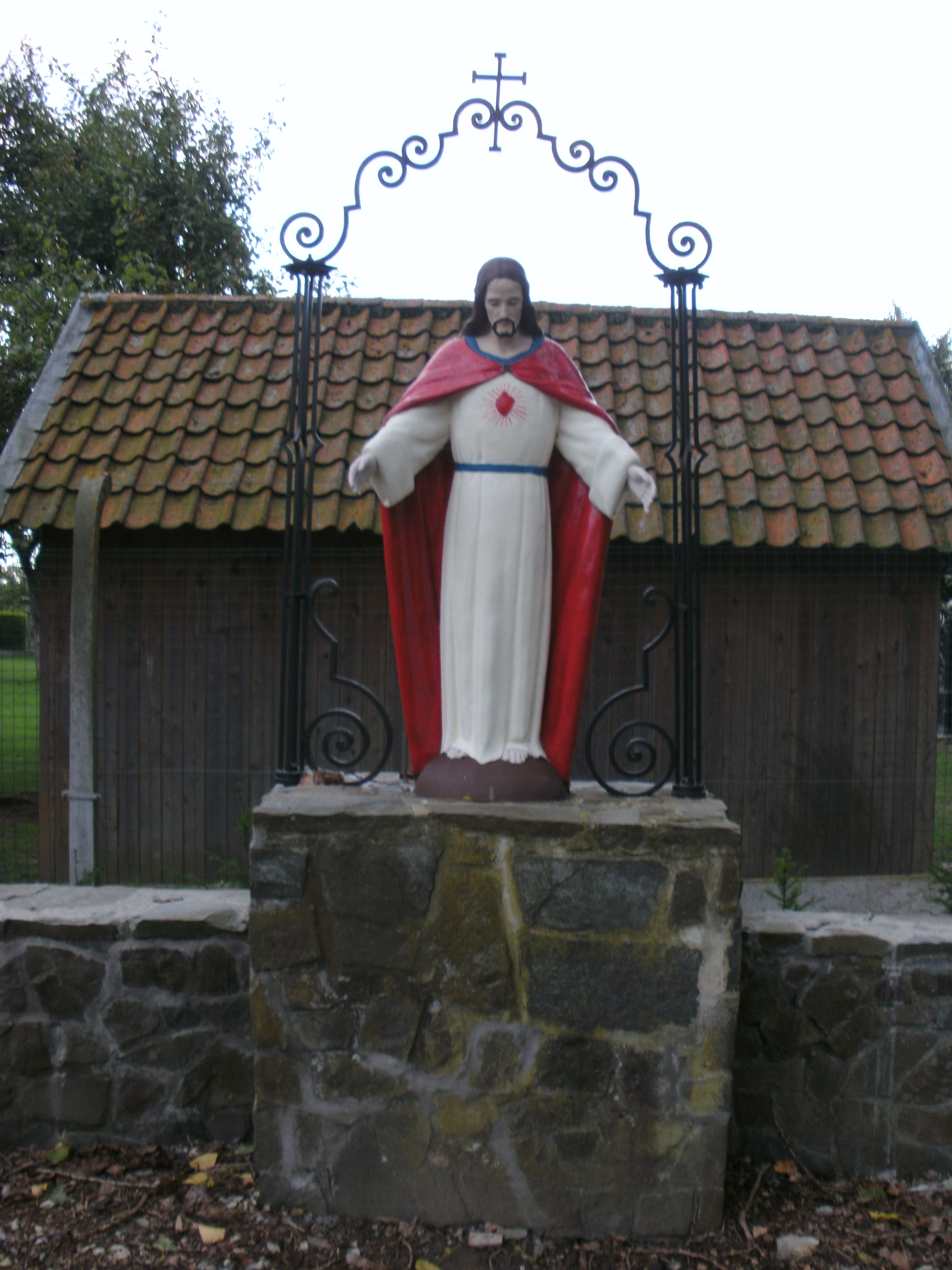
The Christ statue at Keerstraat in Vlekkem

== Tourism ==
Through Vlekkem runs the Molenbeekroute. The Molenbeekroute is a cycle track network, known primarily for the mills of the municipality Erpe-Mere and two brooks that can be found there, which both have the name Molenbeek (mill brook).
