= Ottergem =

Coordinates: 50°56′N 3°57′E

- Village
- Erpe-Mere in East-Flanders
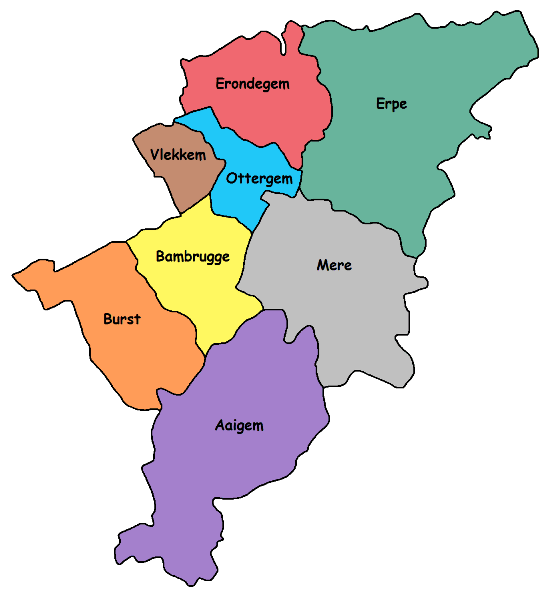
- Localisation of Ottergem in Erpe-Mere

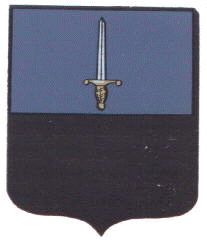
- Coat of arms

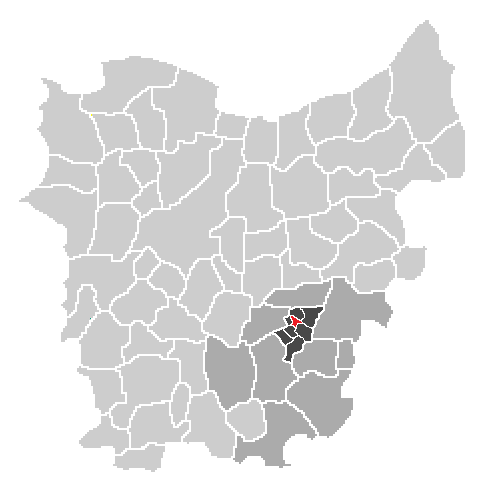
- Localisation of Ottergem in the community of Erpe-Mere in the arrondissement of Aalst in the province of East-Flanders.
- Country: Belgium
- Region: Flanders
- Province: East Flanders
- Arrondissement: Aalst
- Municipality: Erpe-Mere

Area
  - Total: 1.55 km^{2} (0.60 sq mi)
- Elevation: 0 m (0 ft)

Population (2003)
  - Total: 500
  - Density: 322/km^{2} (830/sq mi)
- Source: NIS
- Postal code: 9420

Ottergem is a sub-municipality of Erpe-Mere in Flanders, Belgium. It is located on the Molenbeek in the Denderstreek, southeast of East Flanders and belongs to the Arrondissement of Aalst. The sub-municipality is bordered by the sub-municipalities of Erondegem, Erpe, Mere, Bambrugge (and its hamlet Egem) and Vlekkem and the municipality Sint-Lievens-Houtem (sub-municipality Vlierzele). Ottergem has 500 inhabitants as of 1 January 2003 and an area of 1.55 km. The population density is 322 inhabitants / km².

== History ==
Ottergem was one of the smallest villages of the district of Dendermonde at the beginning of the 19th century, with 155 hectares and 520 people, it was much smaller than the surrounding villages. The village was first mentioned in an official document in 1036. In this charter the emperor Koenraad II recognized the Abbey Sint-Pietersabdij in Ghent and their possessions, they spoke of "et in Bursinghem et terram in Ottringhem et terram in Flachem". Since the year 1142 they spoke of Ottergem, but the variations Ottrenghem, Ottregem and Oterghem were also known. The name is, in the opinion of the historian De Smet, derived from the otter (animal) but the opinion of his colleague Föstermann is that the name is derived from a personal name. Etymologically, Flemish locations ending with –gem refer to a Germanic compound with –haim, meaning 'home' or 'residence', and a derivative ending with –inga. Towards the end of the 19th century, there was a water mill and an oil mill here.

== Landmarks ==
- The "De Watermeulen" is located in the Ruststraat 10–12 on the Molenbeek Brook. It's an overshot watermill and it is protected by law. It was originally a wheat mill and an oil mill, but later on it was only a wheat mill.
- In Ottergem the Sint-Paulus-Bekering Church can be found. Ottergem belongs to deanery of Lede.
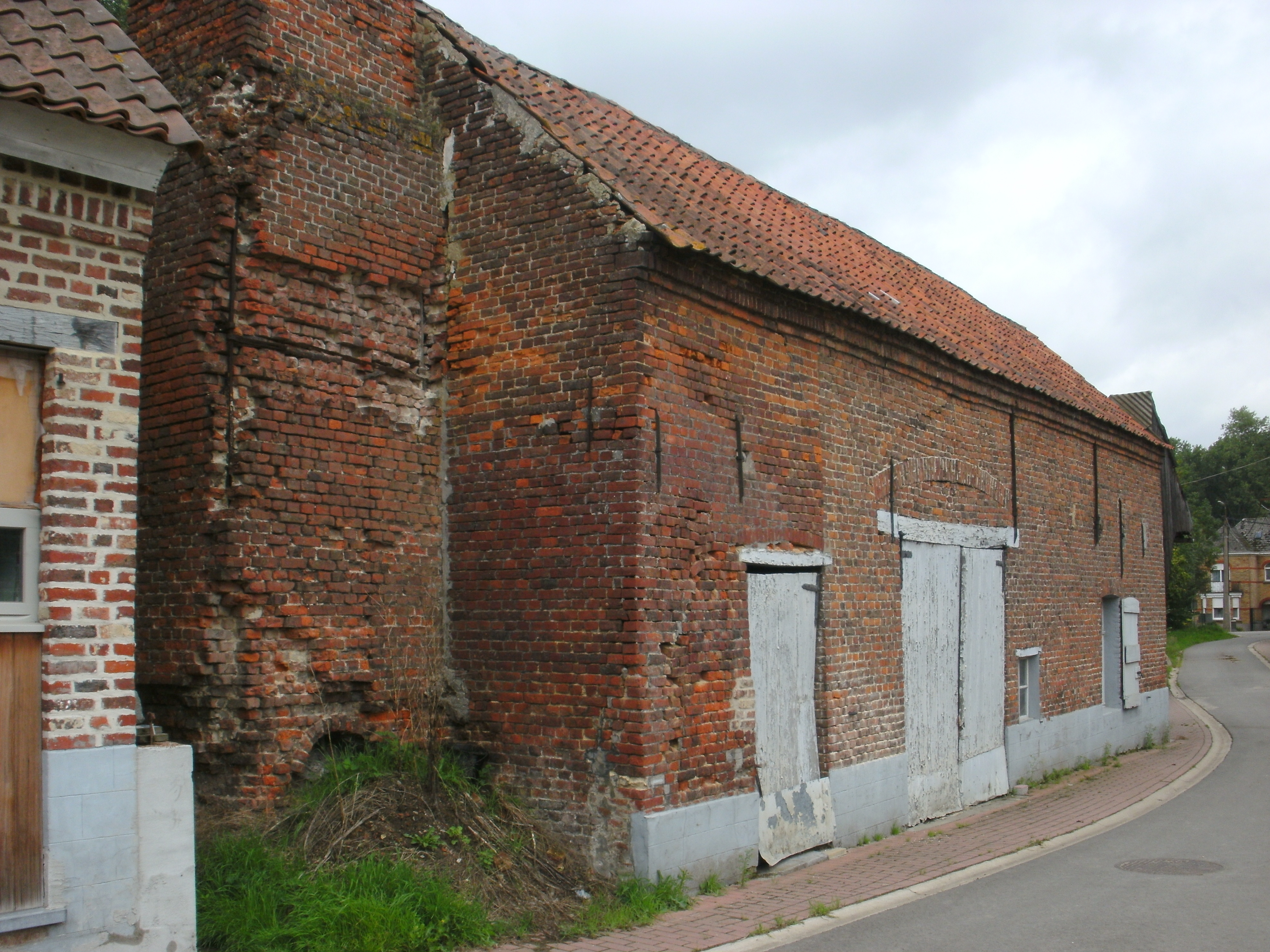
Front view of the De Watermeulen at Ottergem

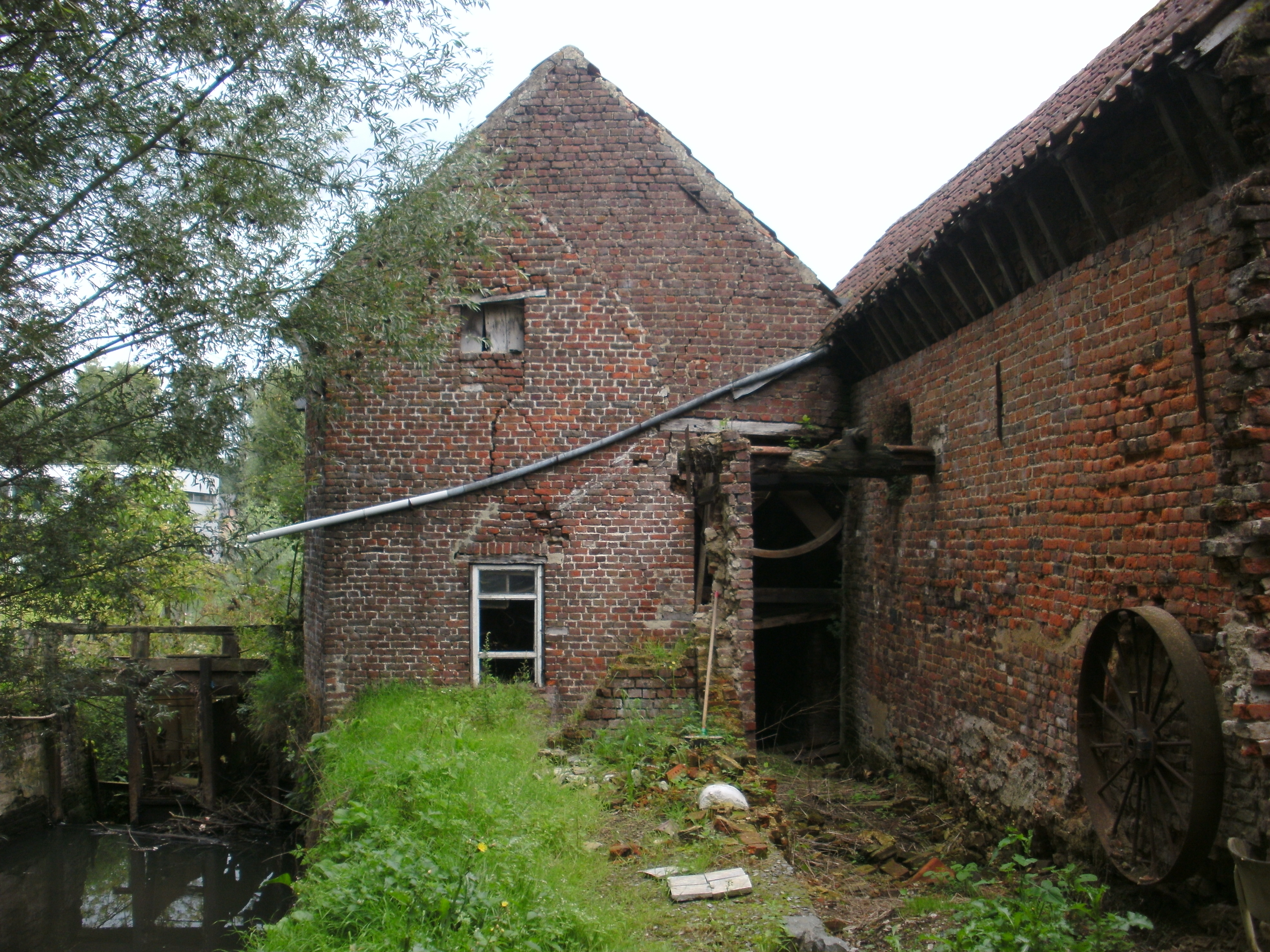
Rear view of the De Watermeulen at Ottergem

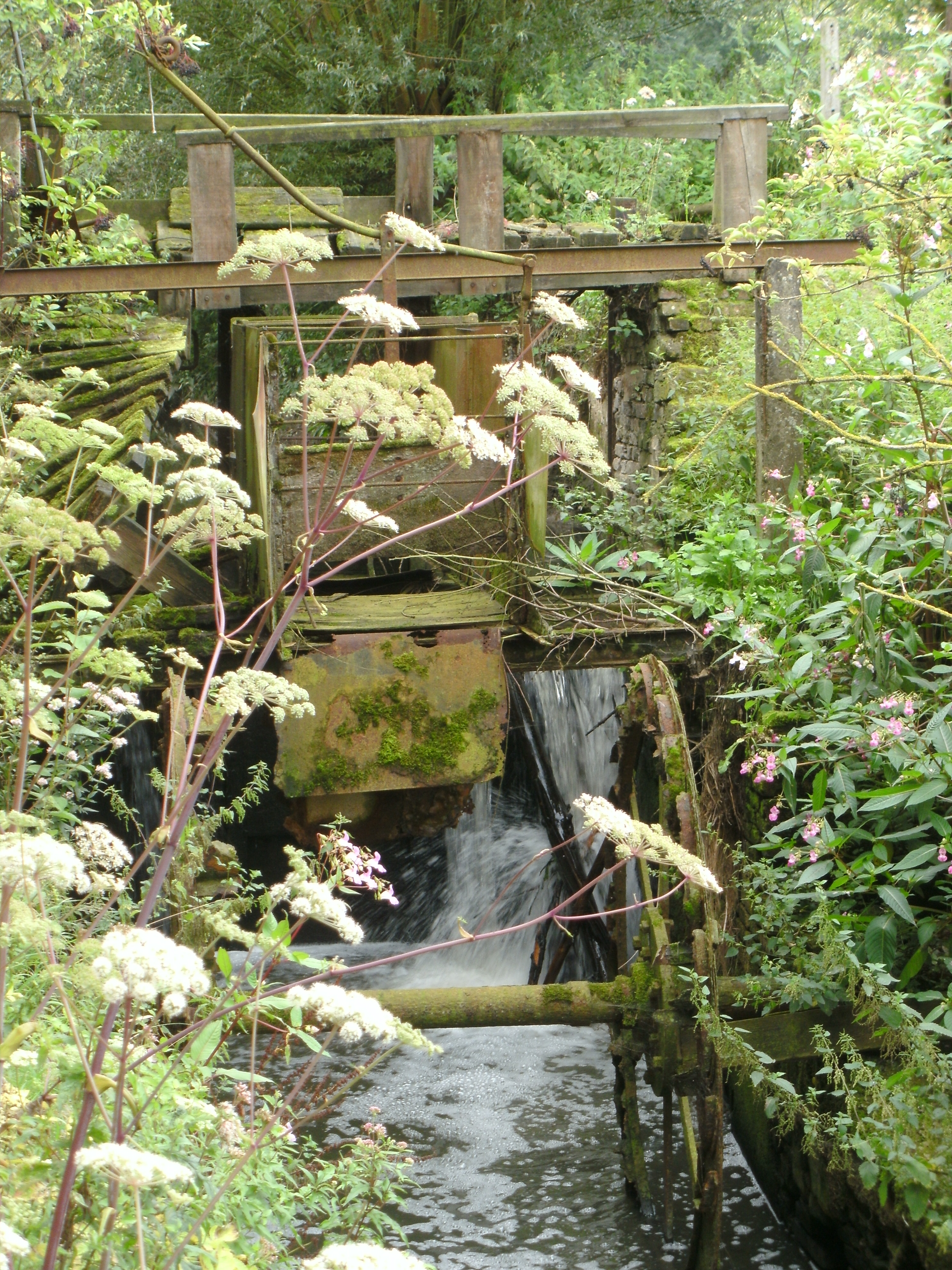
Mill wheel of the De Watermeulen at Ottergem

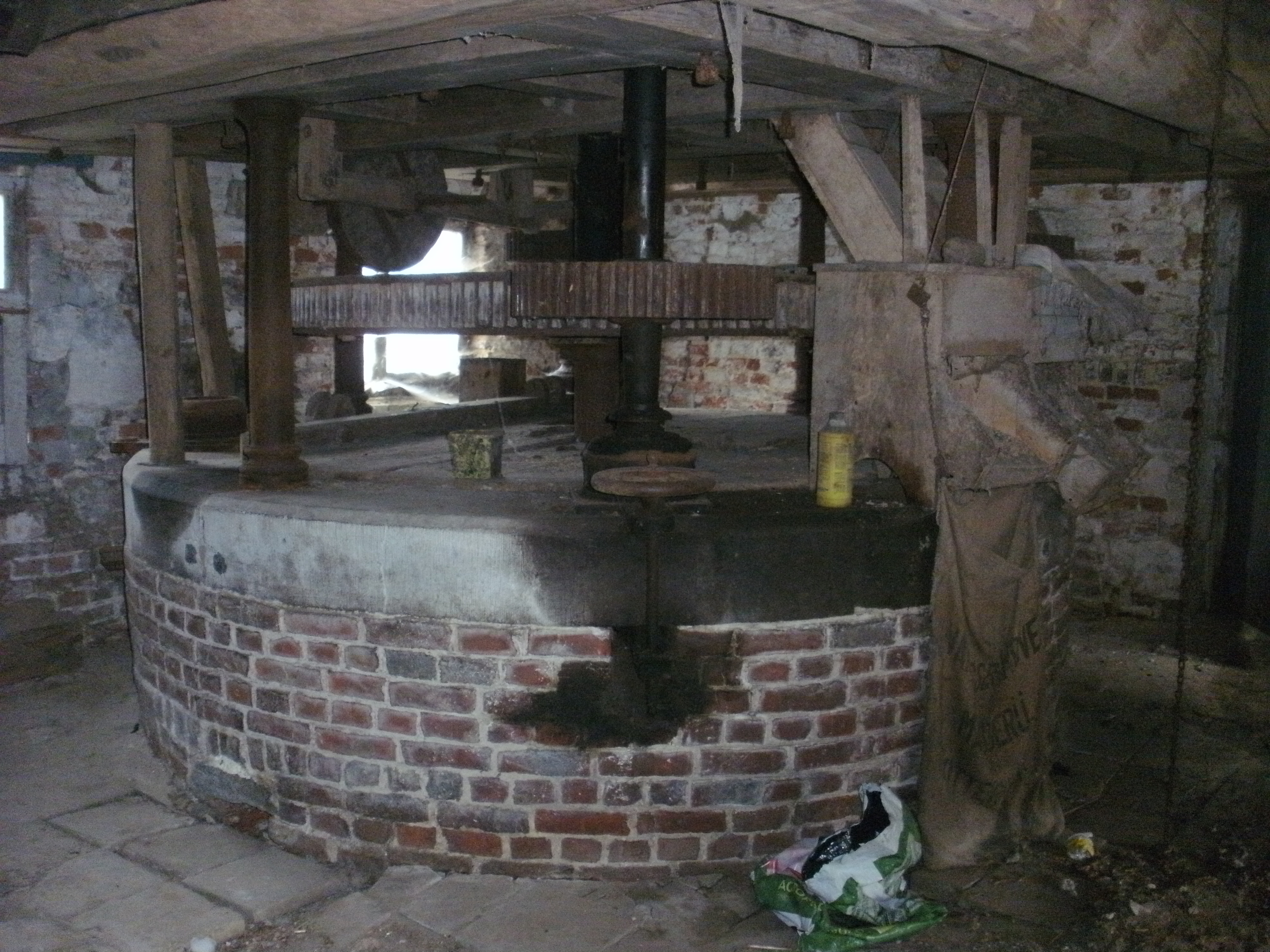
The De Watermeulen inside at Ottergem

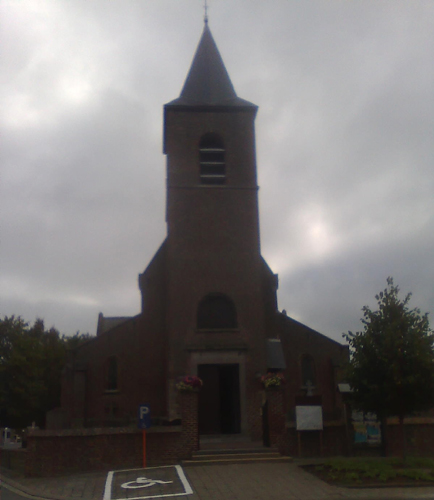
The church of Ottergem front view

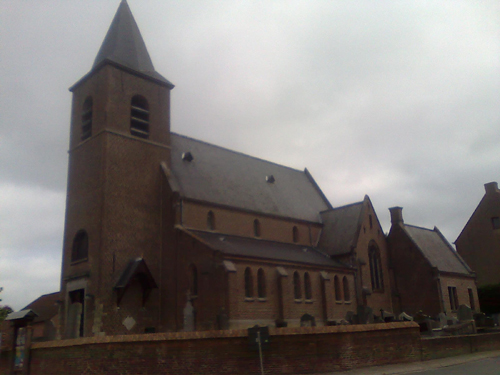
The church of Ottergem side-view

== Tourism ==
Through Ottergem runs the Molenbeekroute. The Molenbeekroute is a cycle track network, known primarily for the mills of the municipality Erpe-Mere and two brooks that can be found there, both of which have the name Molenbeek (mill brook).
