= Molenbeek (Erpe-Mere Bovenschelde) =

Coordinates: 51°00′28″N 3°57′17″E

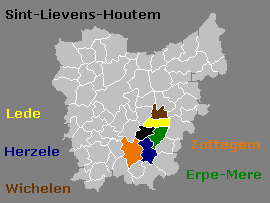
- East Flanders, in color the municipalities of the basin of the Molenbeek.

Location
- Country: Belgium

Physical characteristics
- Source
  - location: Grotenberge
- Mouth
  - location: Scheldt in Wichelen
- Length: 22 km (14 mi)
- Basin size: 52.76 km^{2} (20.37 sq mi)

Basin features
- Progression: Scheldt→ North Sea

The Molenbeek (English: Millbrook) is a brook in the Denderstreek, Belgium. The stream has a length of approximately 22 kilometres (14 mi). The source of the Molenbeek is located in Grotenberge and the delta is in nearby Wichelen. This brook is not to be confused with the 25 kilometres (16 mi) long Molenbeek-Ter Erpenbeek which is also in Erpe-Mere (and Herzele). The 25 kilometres (16 mi) brook is part of the Molenbeek Erpe-Mere drainage basin.

== Basin ==
The basin of the Molenbeek is located in the province of East Flanders, and flows through the municipalities of Wichelen (Schellebelle, Serskamp, Wichelen), Lede (Wanzele, Impe, Smetlede, Papegem, Lede, and Oordegem), Erpe-Mere (Erondegem, Vlekkem, Ottergem, Bambrugge, Egem, and Burst) and Herzele (Borsbeke, Herzele, Ressegem, and Hillegem). The south of the basin comprises a small part of the Zottegem municipality (Grotenberge and Leeuwergem). In the west, it crosses the border of the Sint-Lievens-Houtem territory (Vlierzele, Zonnegem, Letterhoutem).

The Molenbeek (millbrook) is part of the Drie Molenbeken drainage basin. The Drie Molenbeken (three millbrooks) are tributaries of the Bovenschelde. The Bovenschelde is a part of the river Scheldt. The basin of the Molenbeek has an area of approximately 5,276 hectares (20.37 sq mi), and is located in the basin of the Bovenschelde. The Molenbeek goes through the Bovenschelde near Wichelen.

From its source in Grotenberge to the delta nearby, Wichelen of the Molenbeek has the following tributaries: Valleibeek, Fonteinbeek, Doormansbeek, Kasteelgracht, Hellegat, Smoorbeek, Kokelaarsbeek, Zijpbeek, Trotgracht, Overimpebeek, Beekveldzijp, Wellebeek, and Vijverbeek.

== Mills ==
In the municipality of Erpe-Mere, there are three mills on the Molenbeek. One mill is protected by law, while another has been largely demolished, but there are still remains of this mill, and the mill house itself is still intact.

Place	Name(s)	Address	Type	Protected	Info
Bambrugge	Egemmolen; Meuleken Tik Tak	Everdal 21	Overshot watermill	No	Wheat mill The mill wheel has been removed The mill house is used as a country cottage
Bambrugge	Molens Van Sande; Kasteelmolen; Celindermolen	Prinsdaal 33	Overshot watermill	No	It was originally both a wheat mill and a compulsion mill Later on it was just a wheat mill The mill wheel has been removed It is now an industrial flour mill
Ottergem	De Watermeulen	Ruststraat 10-12	Overshot watermill	Yes	It was originally a wheat mill and an oil mill Later on it was only a wheat mill

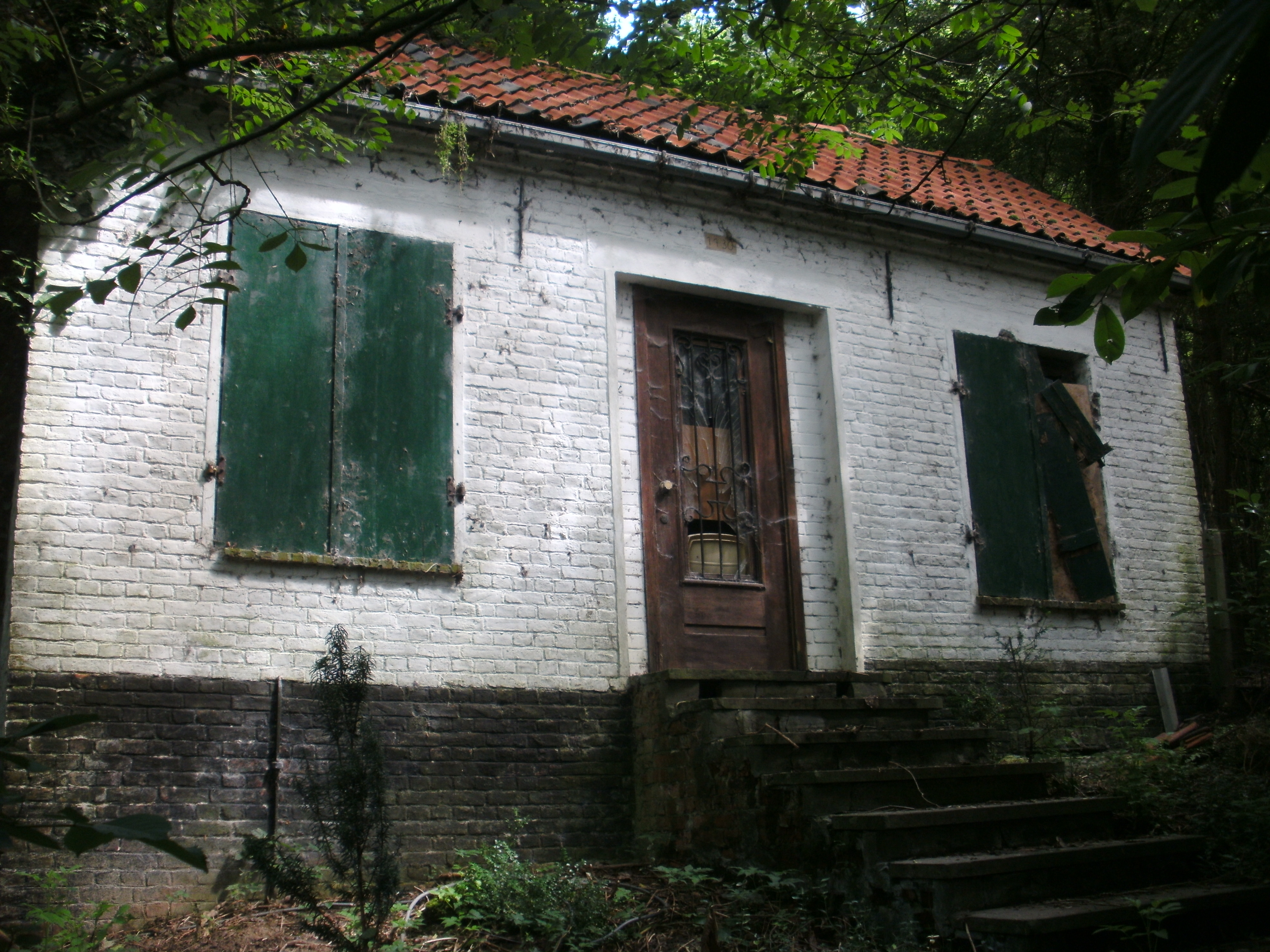
Mill house of the Egemmolen at Bambrugge

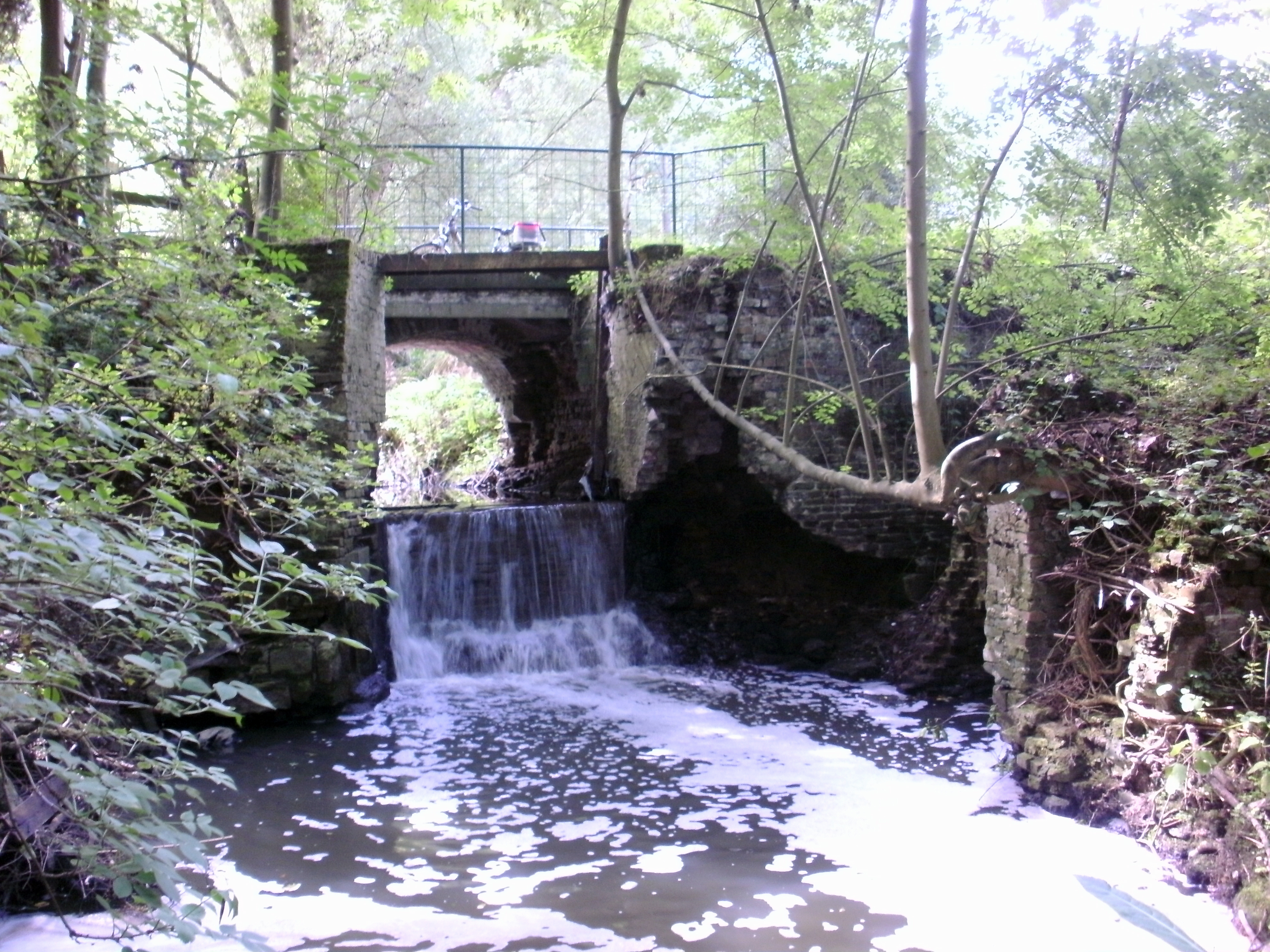
Remains of the Egemmolen at Bambrugge

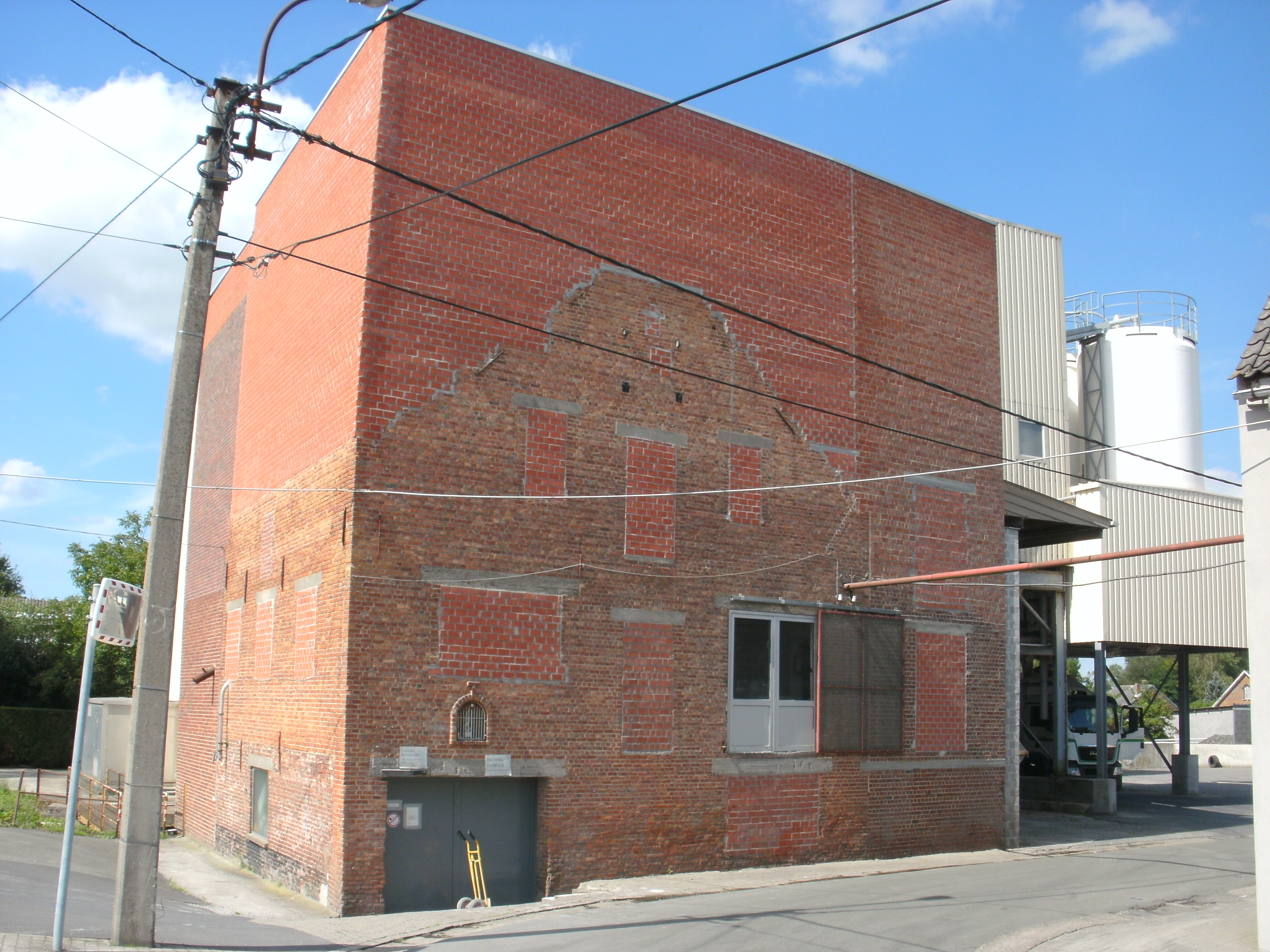
Front view of the Molens Van Sande at Bambrugge

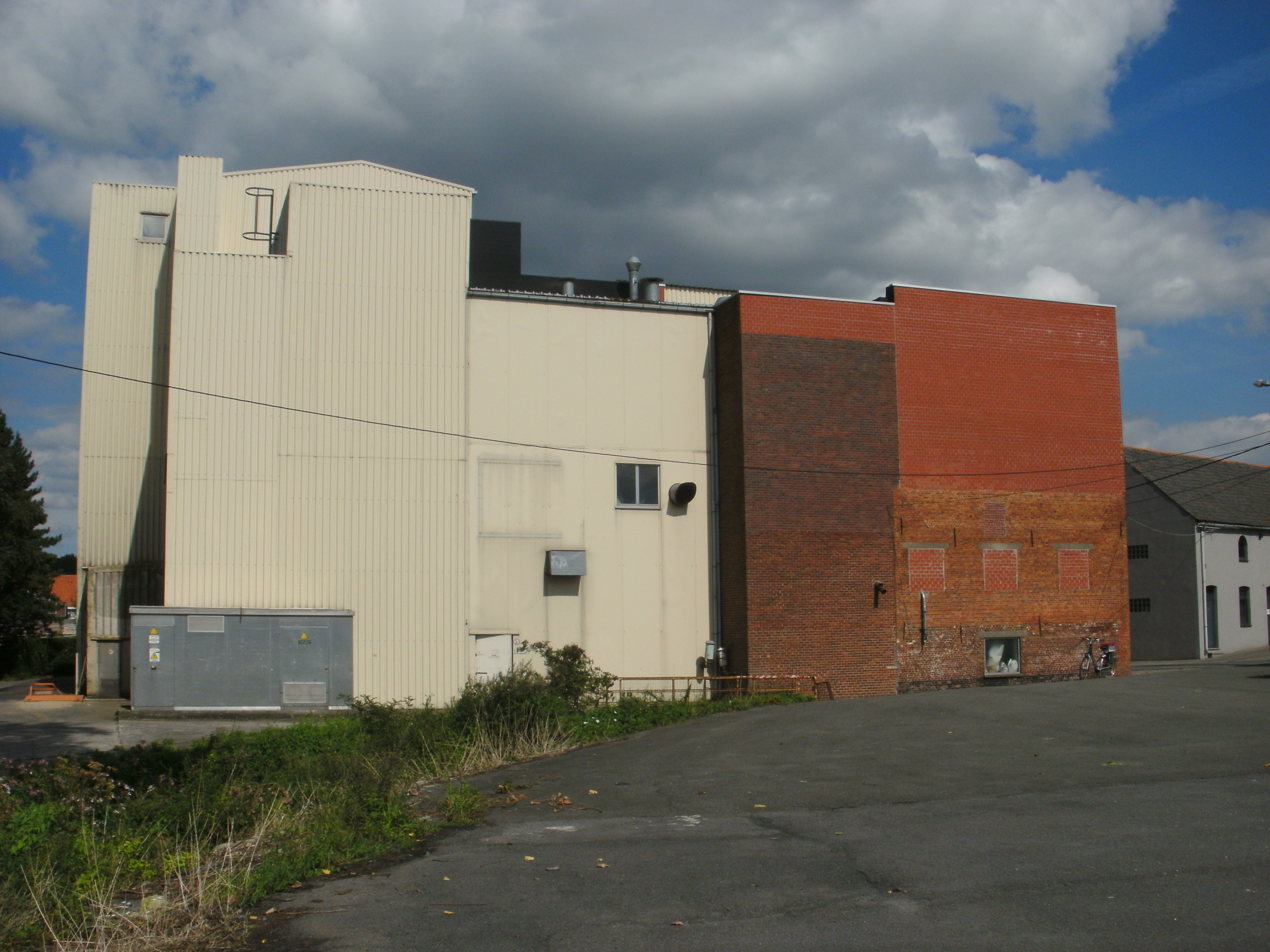
Side-view of the Molens Van Sande at Bambrugge

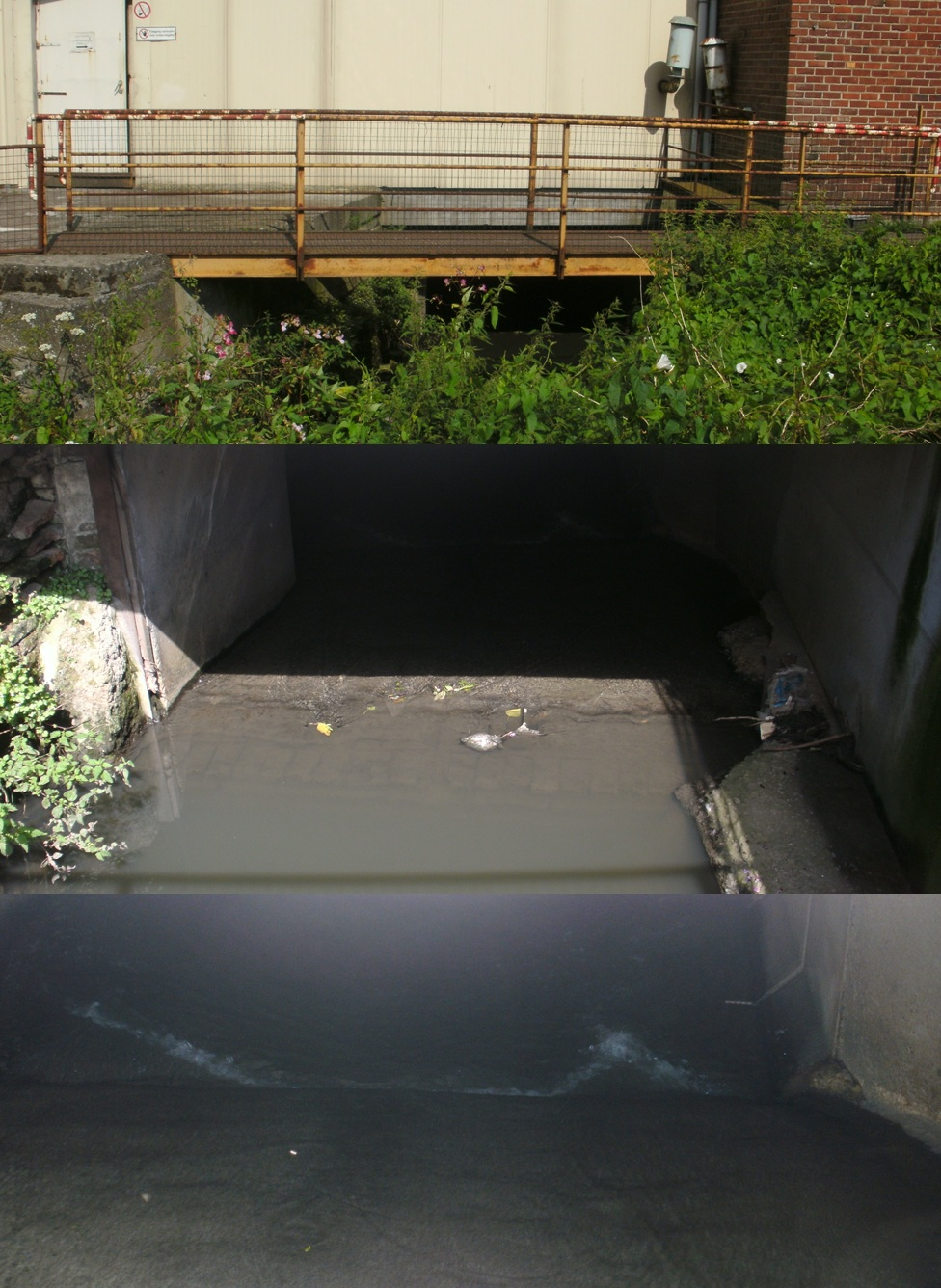
Place where the mill wheel of the Molens Van Sande once was at Bambrugge

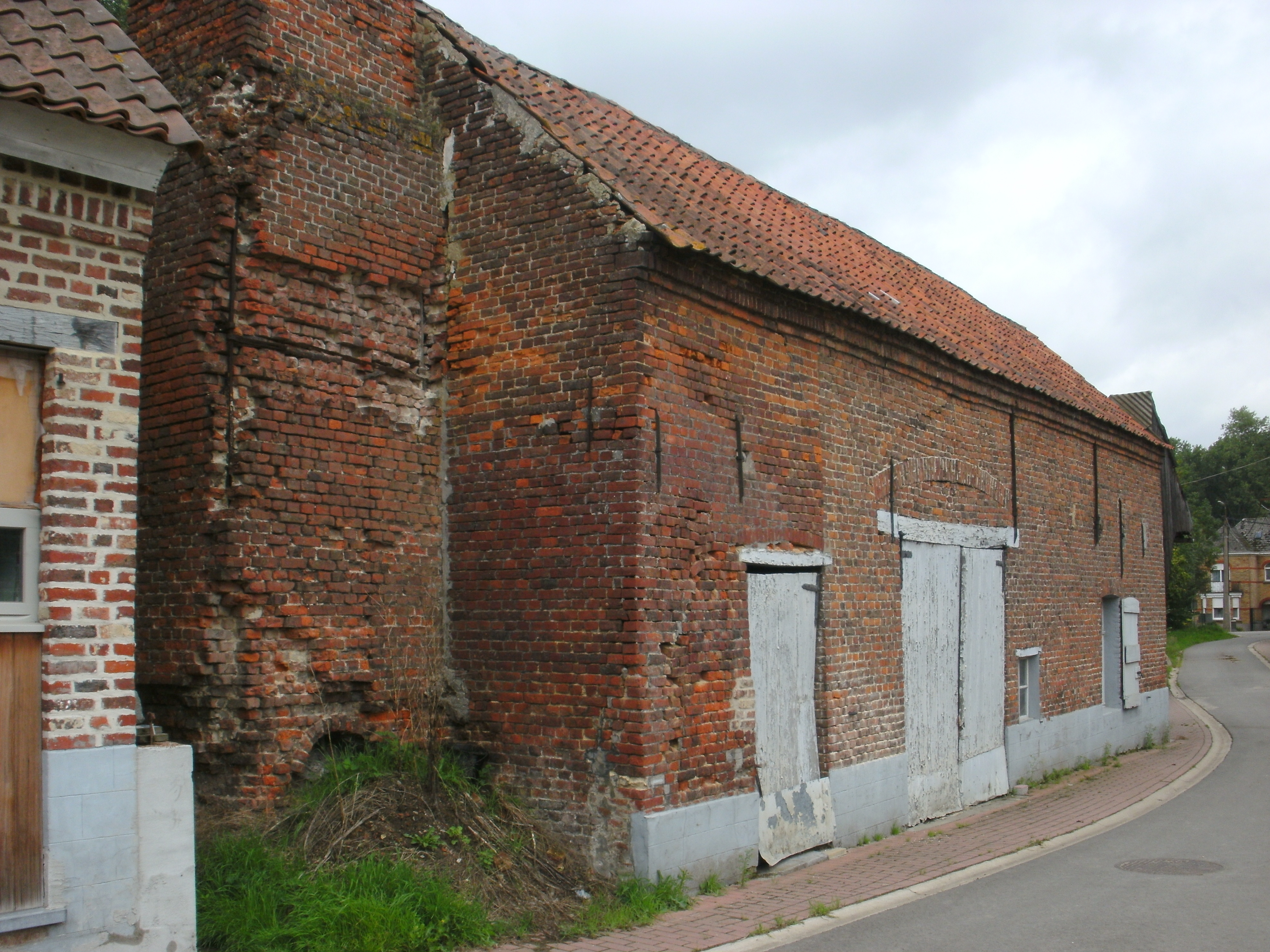
Front view of the De Watermeulen at Ottergem

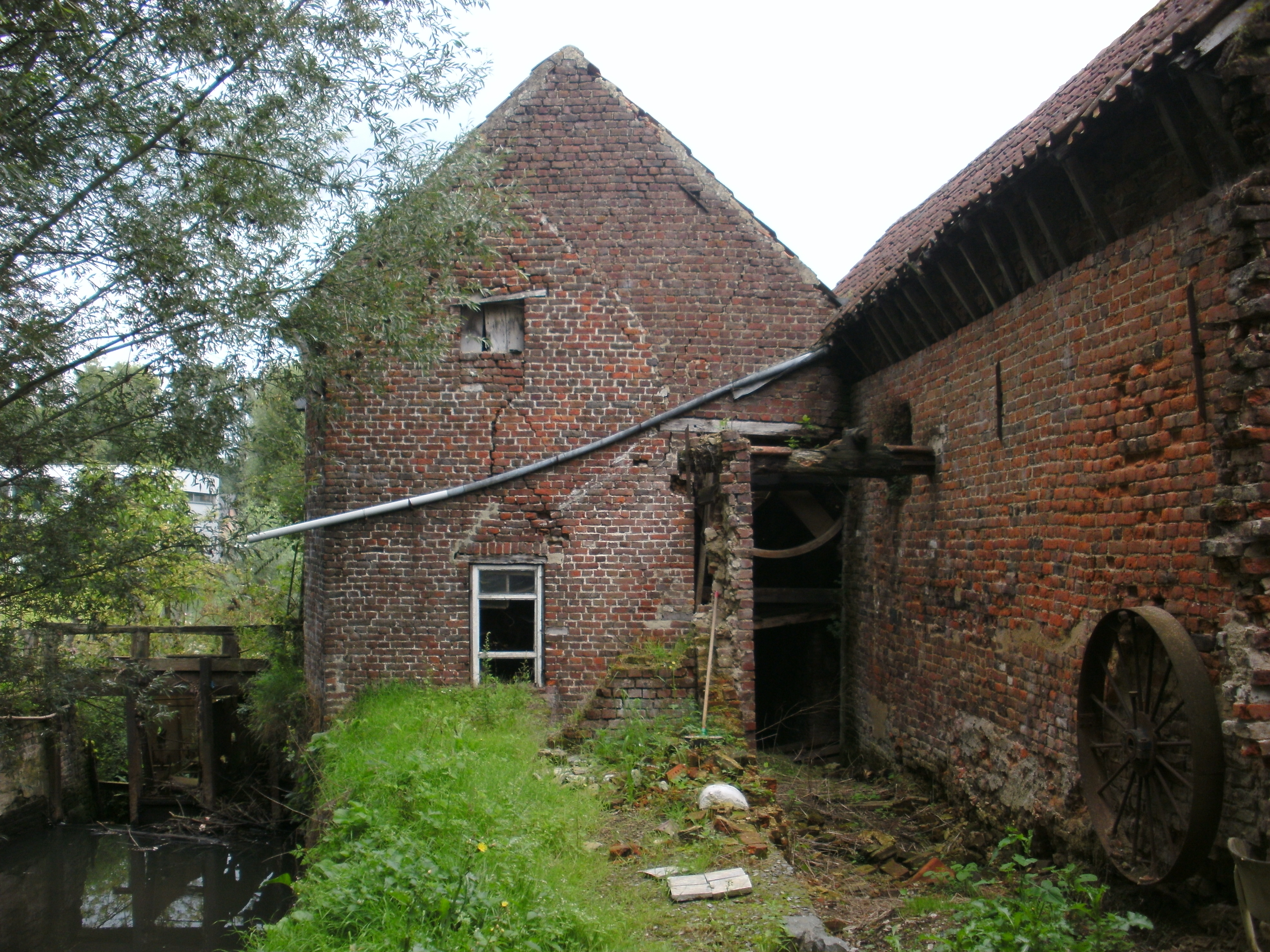
Rear view of the De Watermeulen at Ottergem

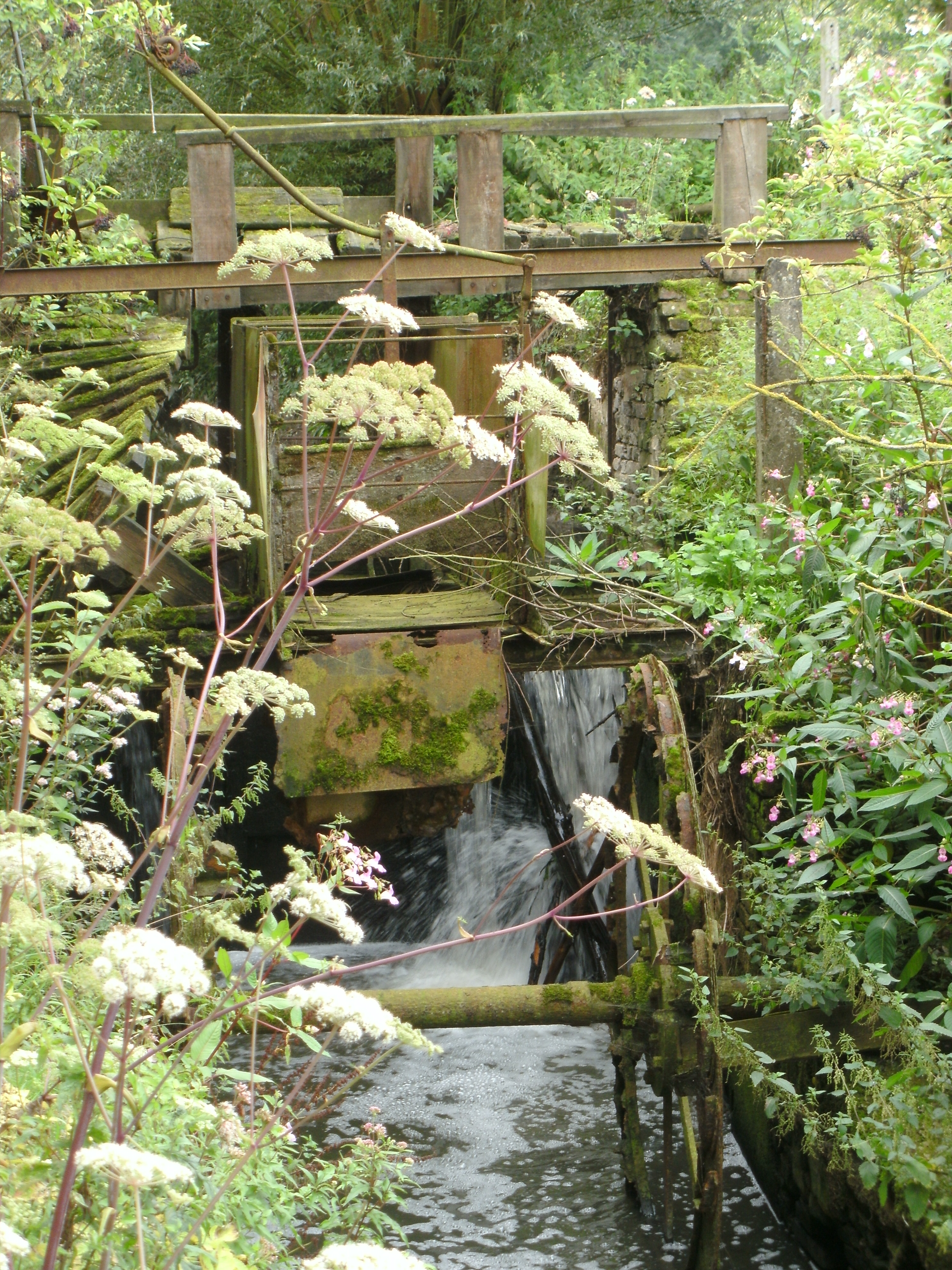
Mill wheel of the De Watermeulen at Ottergem

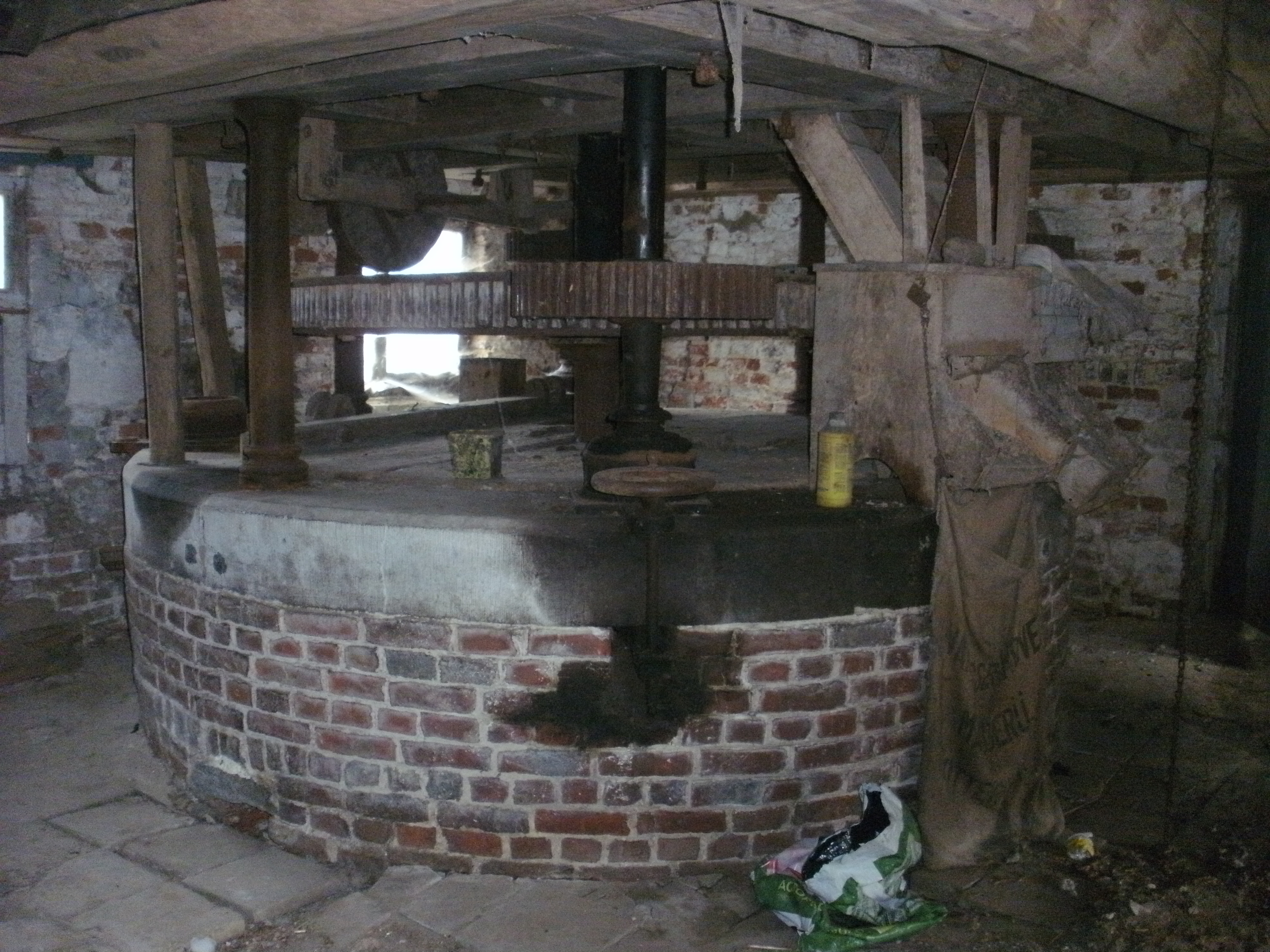
The De Watermeulen inside at Ottergem
