= Mere, Belgium =

Coordinates: 50°55′20″N 3°58′17″E

Mere
- Village
- Erpe-Mere in East-Flanders
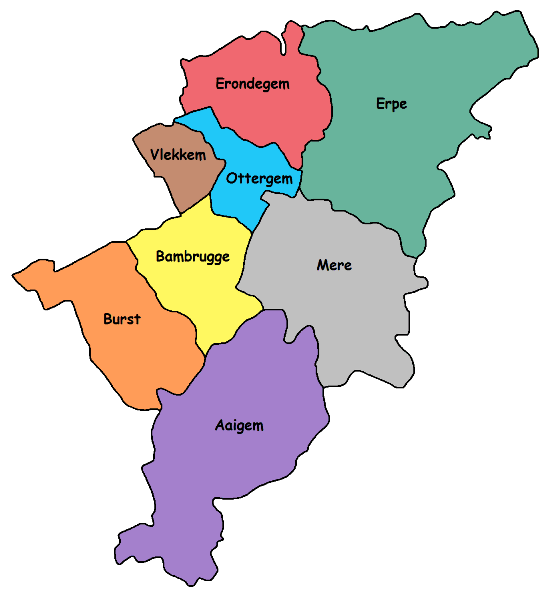
- Localisation of Mere in Erpe-Mere

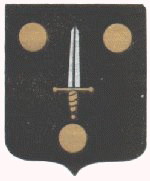
- Coat of arms

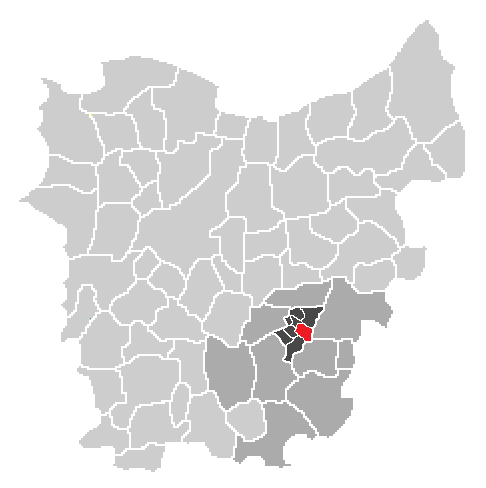
- Localisation of Mere in the community of Erpe-Mere in the arrondissement of Aalst in the province of East-Flanders.
- Country: Belgium
- Region: Flanders
- Province: East Flanders
- Arrondissement: Aalst
- Municipality: Erpe-Mere

Area
  - Total: 5.77 km^{2} (2.23 sq mi)
- Elevation: 0 m (0 ft)

Population (2003)
  - Total: 5,033
  - Density: 873/km^{2} (2,260/sq mi)
- Source: NIS
- Postal code: 9420

Mere is a sub-municipality of Erpe-Mere in Flanders. It is located on the Molenbeek-Ter Erpenbeek in the Denderstreek in the southeast of East Flanders and belongs to Arrondissement of Aalst. It is bordered by the sub-municipalities of Erpe, Ottergem, Bambrugge and Aaigem and the municipalities Haaltert (sub-municipality Haaltert) and Aalst (sub-municipality Nieuwerkerken). Mere has 5033 inhabitants as of 1 January 2003 and an area of 5.77 km. The population density is 873 inhabitants / km ².

== History ==
On the opposite side of a windmill in the Jeruzalemstraat (a street), the remains of a Roman villa have been found (on the hill opposite the Merelputstraat). Mere was mentioned in a 1003 document as Meren. Perhaps the name comes from the numerous swamps (Meren in Dutch) in the neighbourhood of the village. At the beginning of the 19th century, the village had 1874 inhabitants and at the end of the 19th Century it had 2942 inhabitants. At that time there was a windmill, three water mills and one factory, which gave 1000 people jobs. Each year around 300 people went to France to help as seasonal workers at the harvest.

== Geography ==
The highest point of the sub-municipality Mere is on the Gotegemberg with a peak of 68 meters height. In the Diepestraat (a street) next to the windmill teeth of various marine fish, including sharks, have been found. They show that the land was pre-historically at the bottom of a sea.

== Landmarks ==
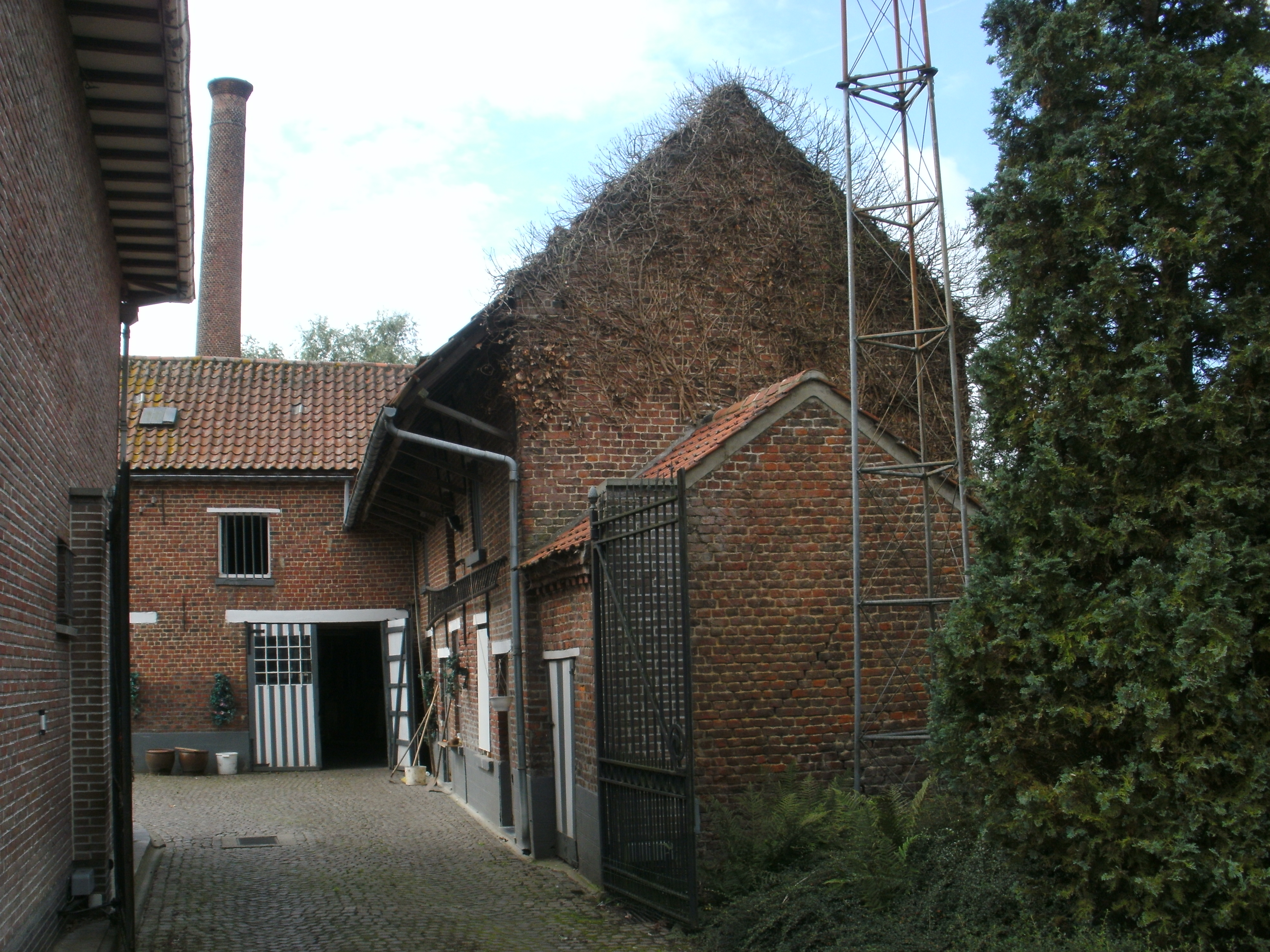
Front view of the De Graevesmolen at Mere

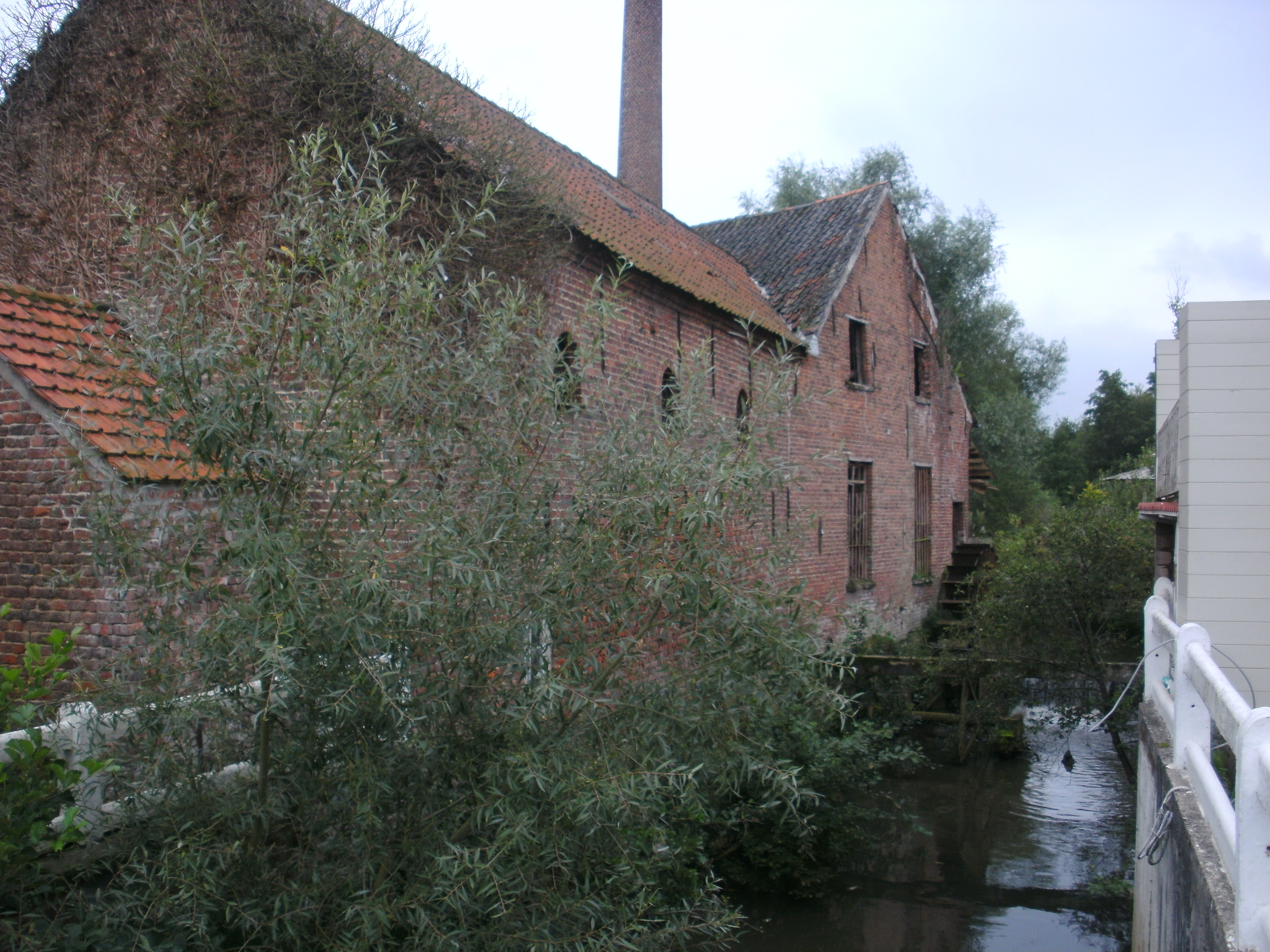
Side-view of the De Graevesmolen at Mere

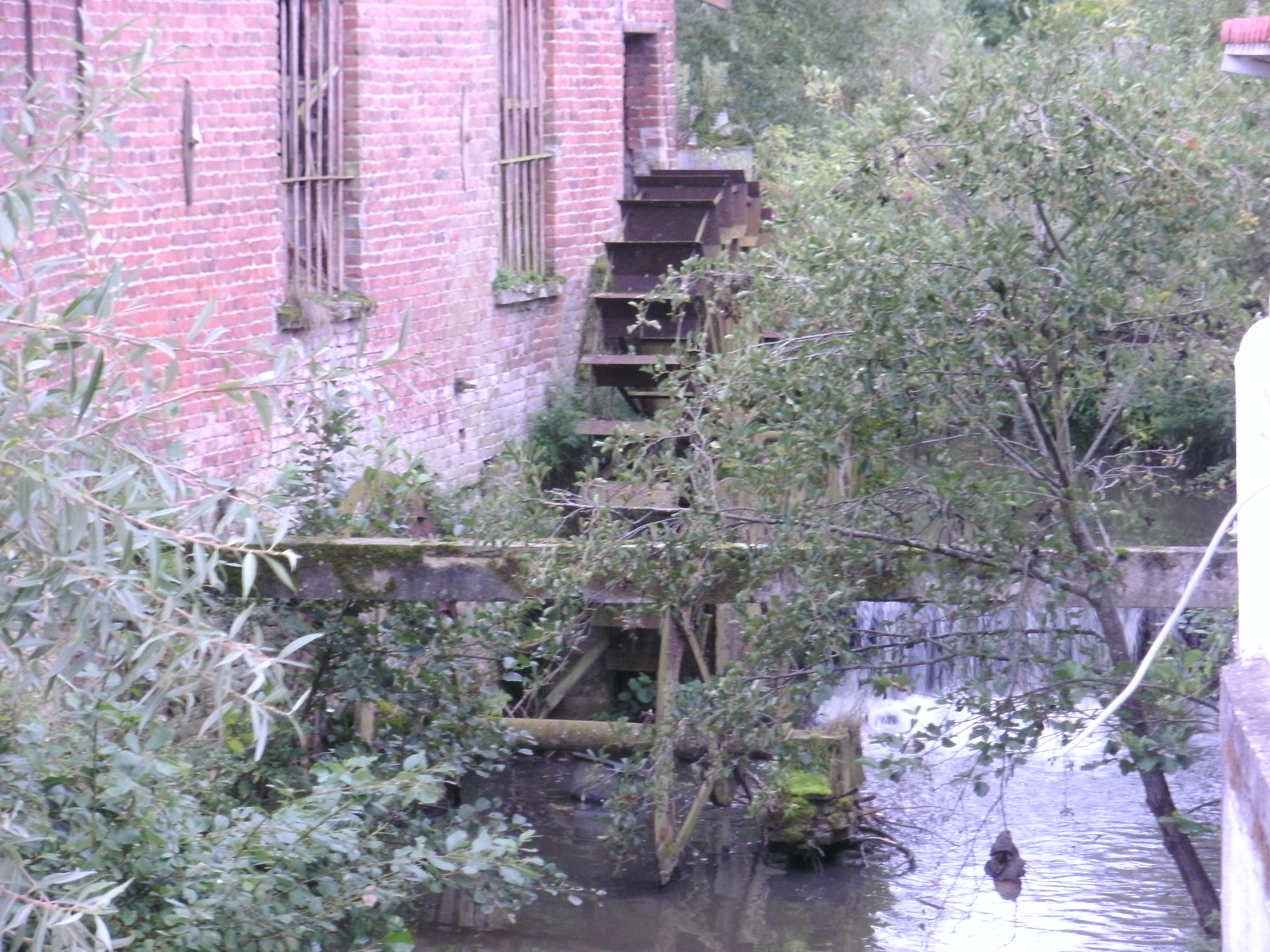
Mill wheel of the De Graevesmolen at Mere

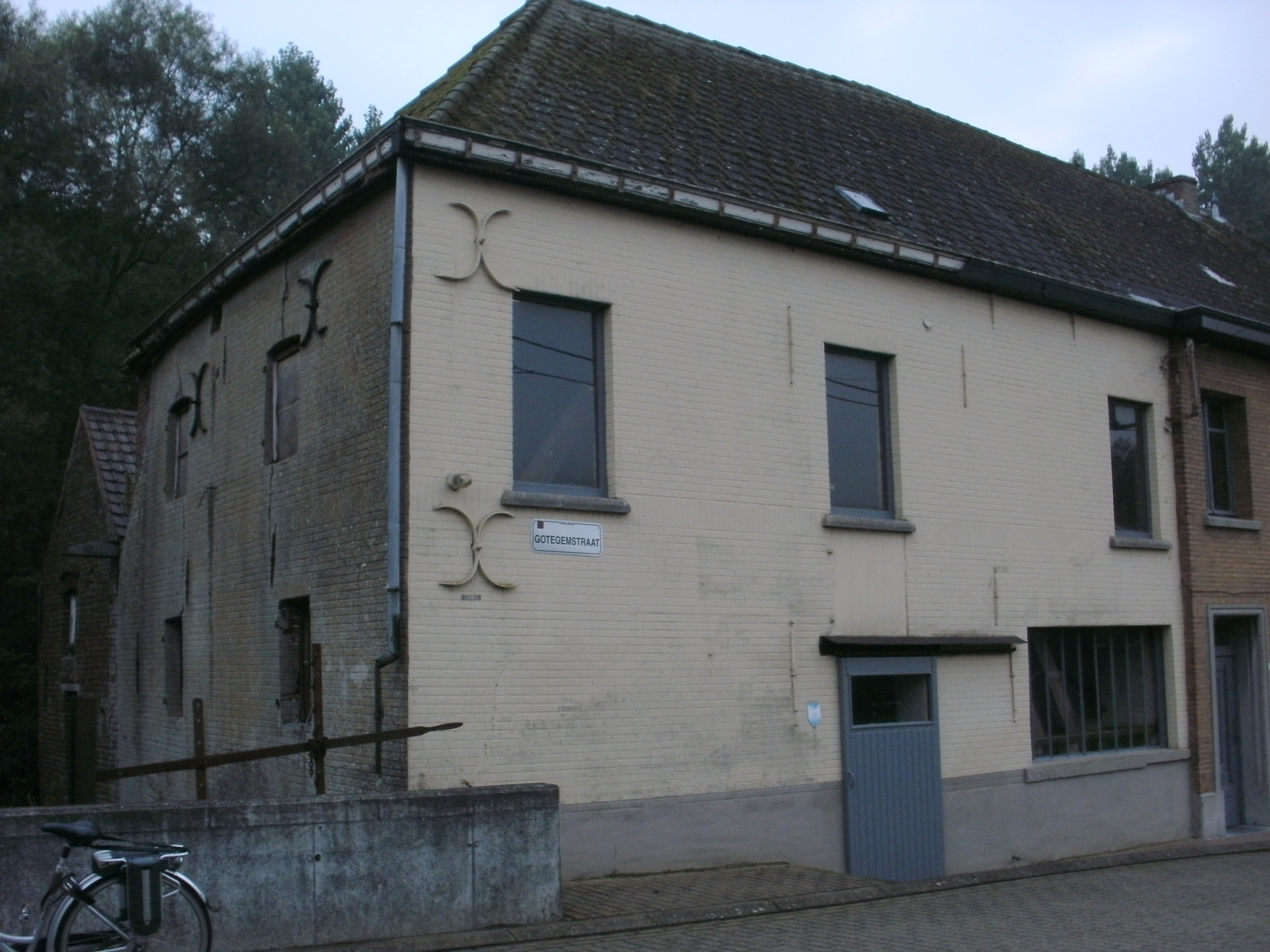
Gotegemmolen at Mere

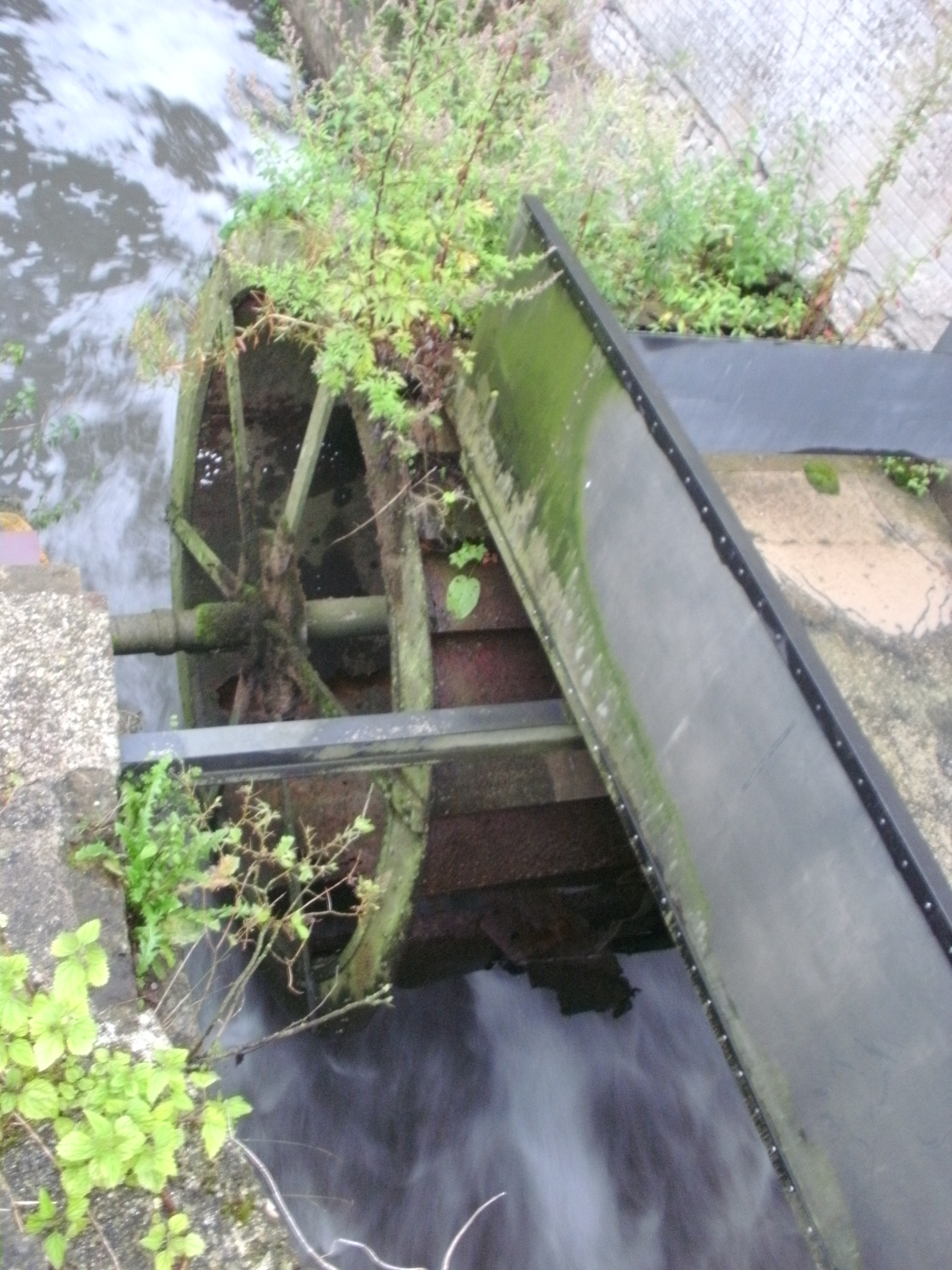
Mill wheel of the Gotegemmolen at Mere

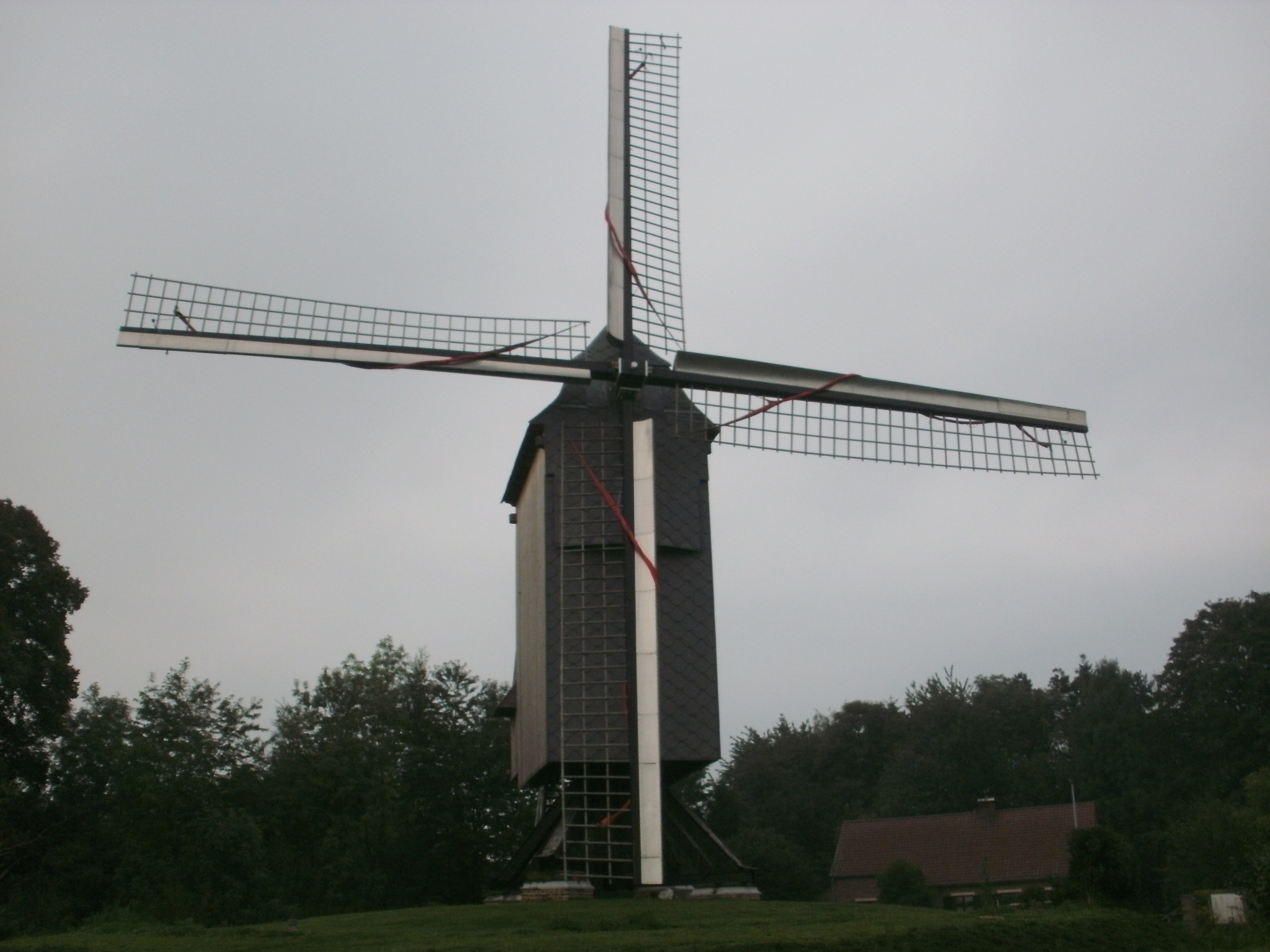
Kruiskoutermolen at Mere

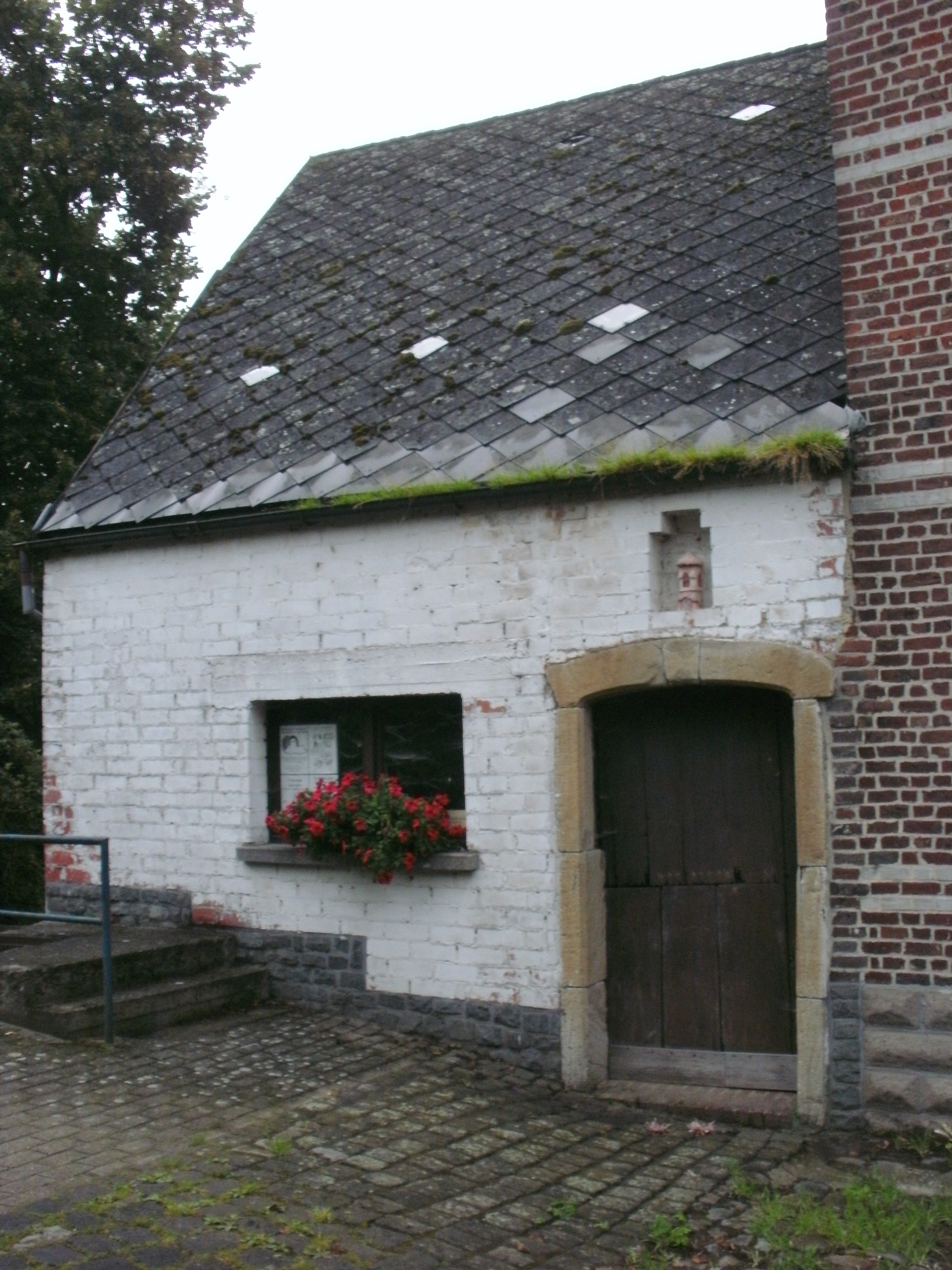
Molen te Broeck at Mere

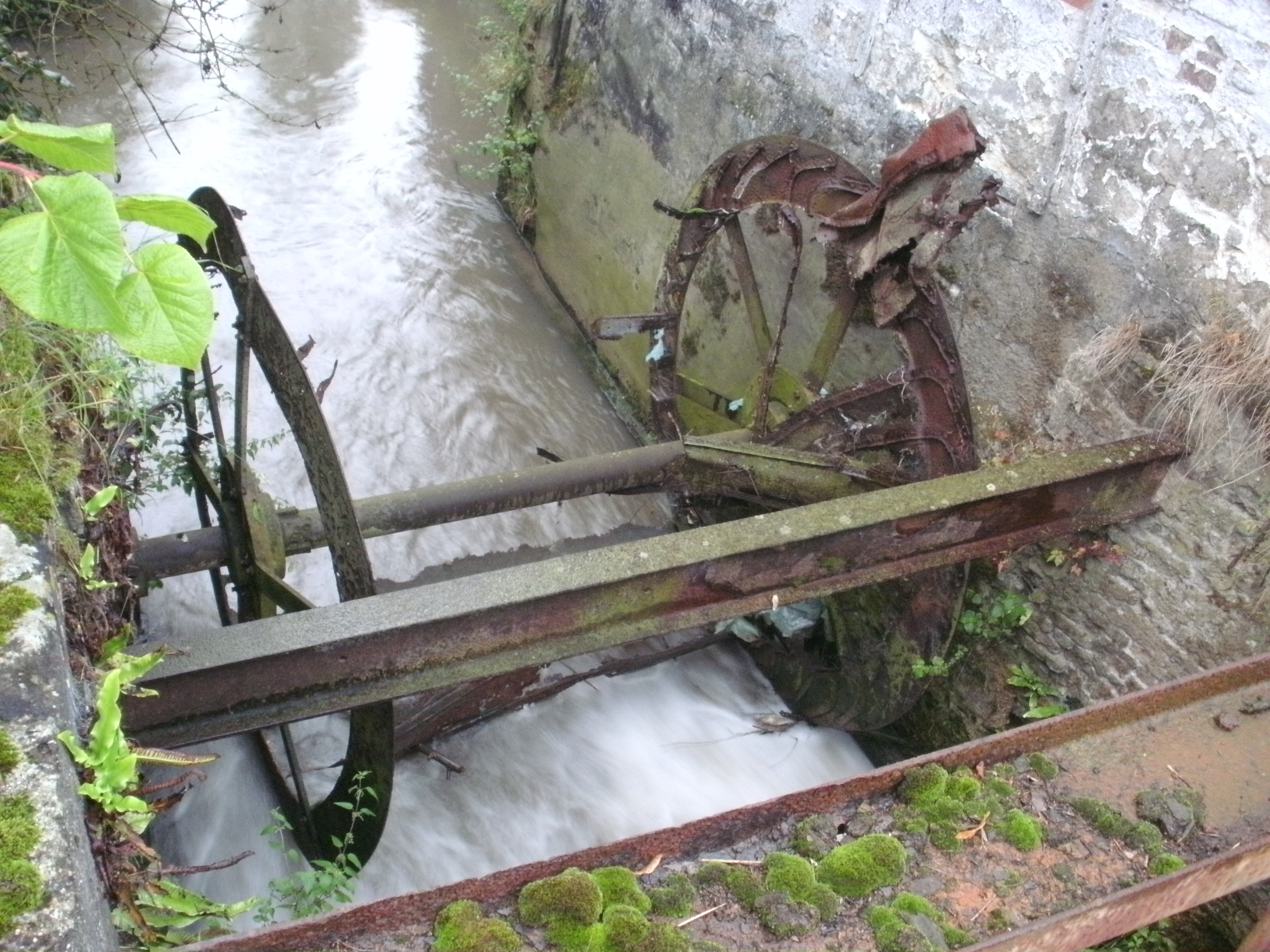
Mill wheel of the Molen te Broeck at Mere

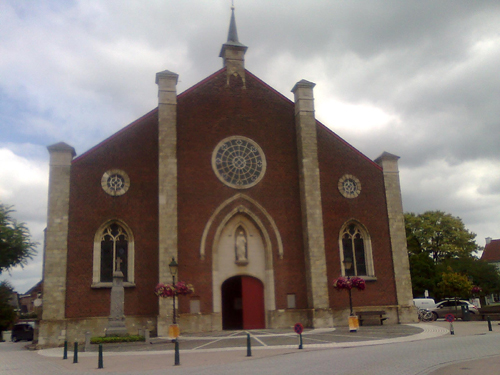
The church of Mere front view

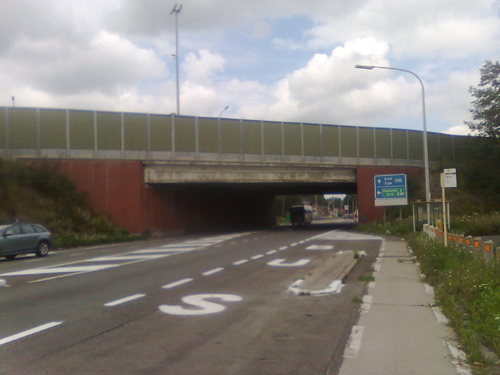
The motorway bridge (E40) of Mere over the Oudenaardsesteenweg

There are three water mills in Mere, with all of them being located on the Molenbeek Brook. They are the De Graevesmolen, the Gotegemmolen and the Molen te Broeck. On the Koudenberg, one of the highest hills of the community, there is also a windmill. It was re-mounted on its base in 2006 after it was restored in 2004 by a studio in Roeselare. The Kruiskoutermolen was restored in 2006 and is operational. It can be visited by appointment with the tourist service.

Name(s)	Address	Type	Protected	Info
De Graevesmolen	Bosstraat 25	Overshot watermill	Yes	Wheat mill and oil mill
Gotegemmolen	Gotegemstraat 1	Overshot watermill	Yes	Wheat mill
Kruiskoutermolen; Jezuïtenmolen; Molen Van Der Haegen	Schoolstraat	Post windmill with open foot	Yes	Wheat mill
Molen te Broeck 't Hof Schuurke	Wilgendries 6	Overshot watermill	Yes	Wheat mill

The Sint-Baafs Church can be found in Mere. Mere belongs to deanery of Lede.

== Tourism ==
Through Mere runs the Molenbeekroute. The Molenbeekroute is a cycle track network, known primarily for the mills of the municipality Erpe-Mere and two brooks that can be found there, both of which have the name Molenbeek (mill brook).

== Sport ==
The football club FC Mere plays in Mere, and is currently active in the fourth provincial league of the province of East Flanders as of 2012.
