= Erpe =

- Village
- Erpe-Mere in East-Flanders
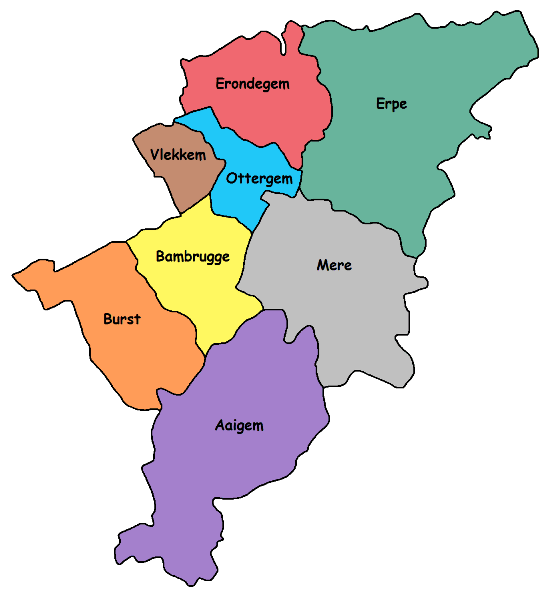
- Localisation of Erpe in Erpe-Mere

- Coat of arms

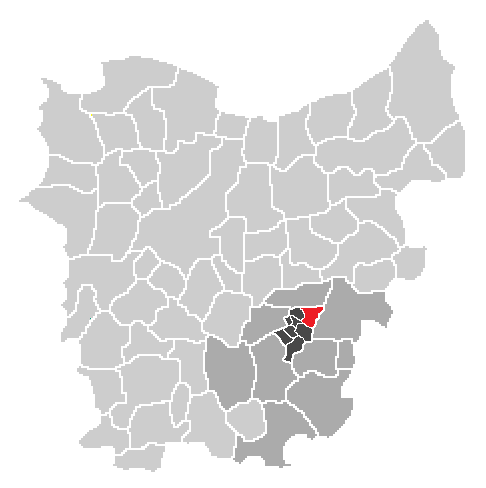
- Localisation of Erpe in the community of Erpe-Mere in the arrondissement of Aalst in the province of East-Flanders
- Country: Belgium
- Region: Flanders
- Province: East Flanders
- Arrondissement: Aalst
- Municipality: Erpe-Mere

Area
  - Total: 8.28 km^{2} (3.20 sq mi)
- Elevation: 0 m (0 ft)

Population (2003)
  - Total: 4,903
  - Density: 592/km^{2} (1,530/sq mi)
- Source: NIS
- Postal code: 9420

Erpe is a sub-municipality of Erpe-Mere in Flanders, Belgium, on the Molenbeek-Ter Erpenbeek in the Denderstreek in the southeast of East Flanders and belongs to Arrondissement of Aalst. The sub-municipality is bordered by the sub-municipalities of Mere, Ottergem, and Erondegem and the municipalities Lede and Aalst. Erpe had 4903 inhabitants as of 1 January 2003 and an area of 8.28 km^{2} (3.20 sq mi). The population density is 592/km^{2} (1,530/sq mi).

== History ==
Erpe was first mentioned in a document of 1057, although the village is probably much older. The name is derived from the word Erpo. In the 18th and 19th centuries the population of Erpe grew steadily. In 1769 there were 1032 inhabitants, in 1801 there were 1638 inhabitants, and by 1893 the village had 2394 inhabitants. By the end of the 19th century, there were two water mills in the village, a windmill, two breweries and a vinegar maker.

== Landmarks ==
There is a water tower of the Tussengemeentelijke Maatschappij der Vlaanderen voor Watervoorziening.

There are two water mills in Erpe, the Cottemmolen and the Van Der Biestmolen, both on the Molenbeek Brook.

The Cottemmolen is at the Molenstraat 36. It is an overshot watermill which is protected. It was originally both a wheat mill and an oil mill, but later it only functioned as a wheat mill.

The Van Der Biestmolen is at Dorpsstraat 3. It is an overshot watermill which is not protected and now functions as a wheat mill.

Sint-Martinus Church in Erpe belongs to the deanery of Lede.

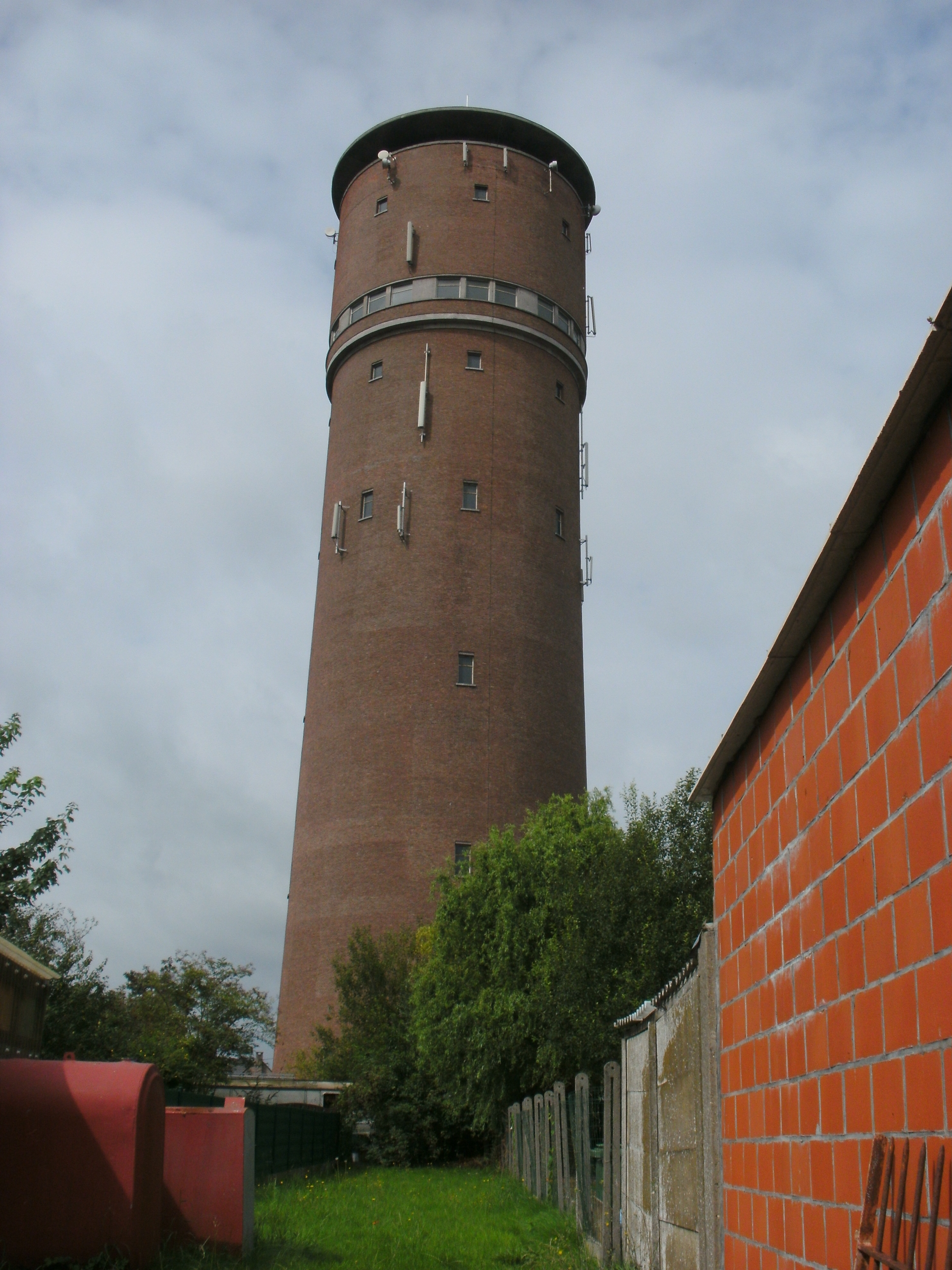
Water tower at Erpe

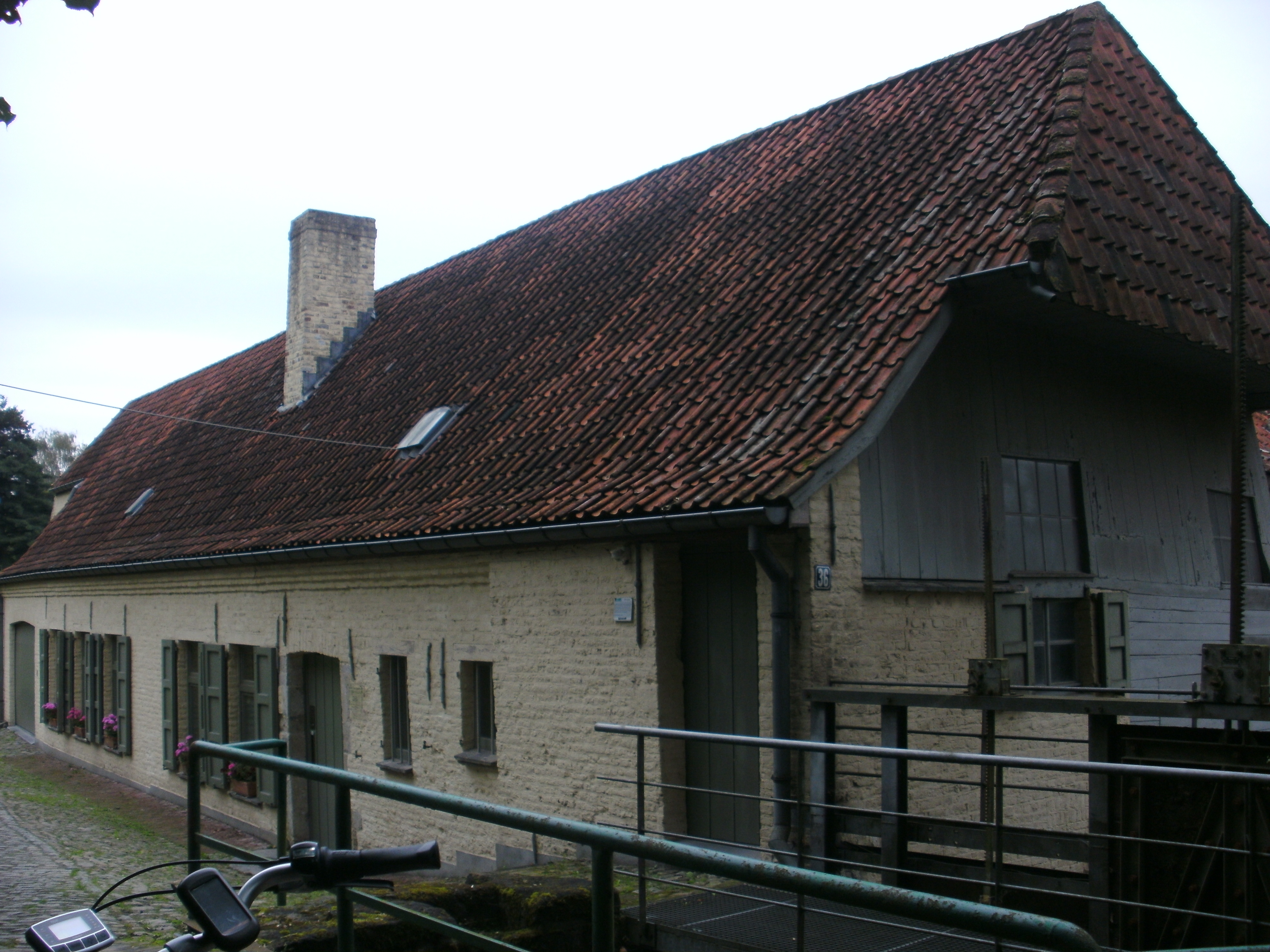
Front view of the Cottemmolen at Erpe

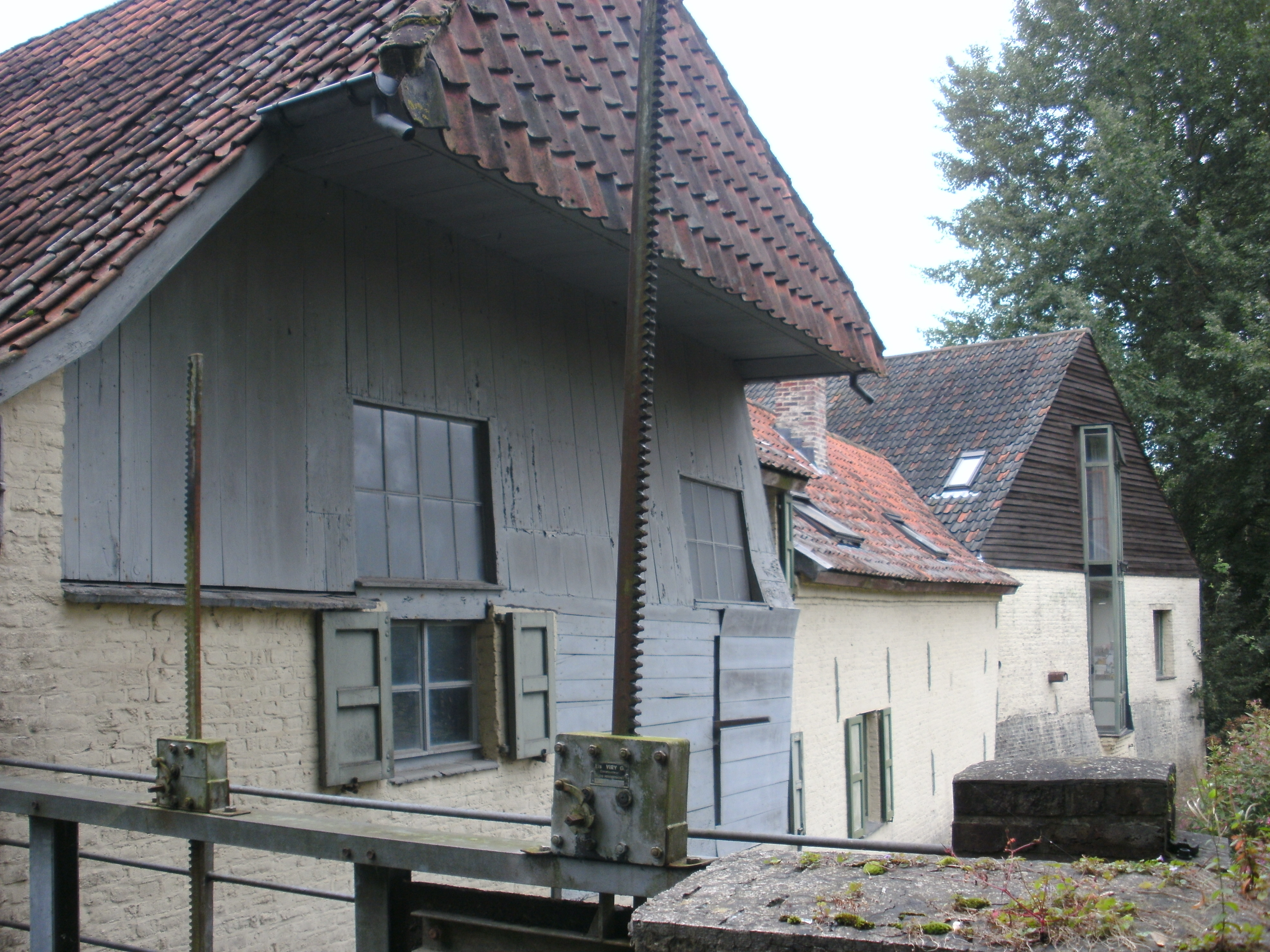
Side-view of the Cottemmolen at Erpe

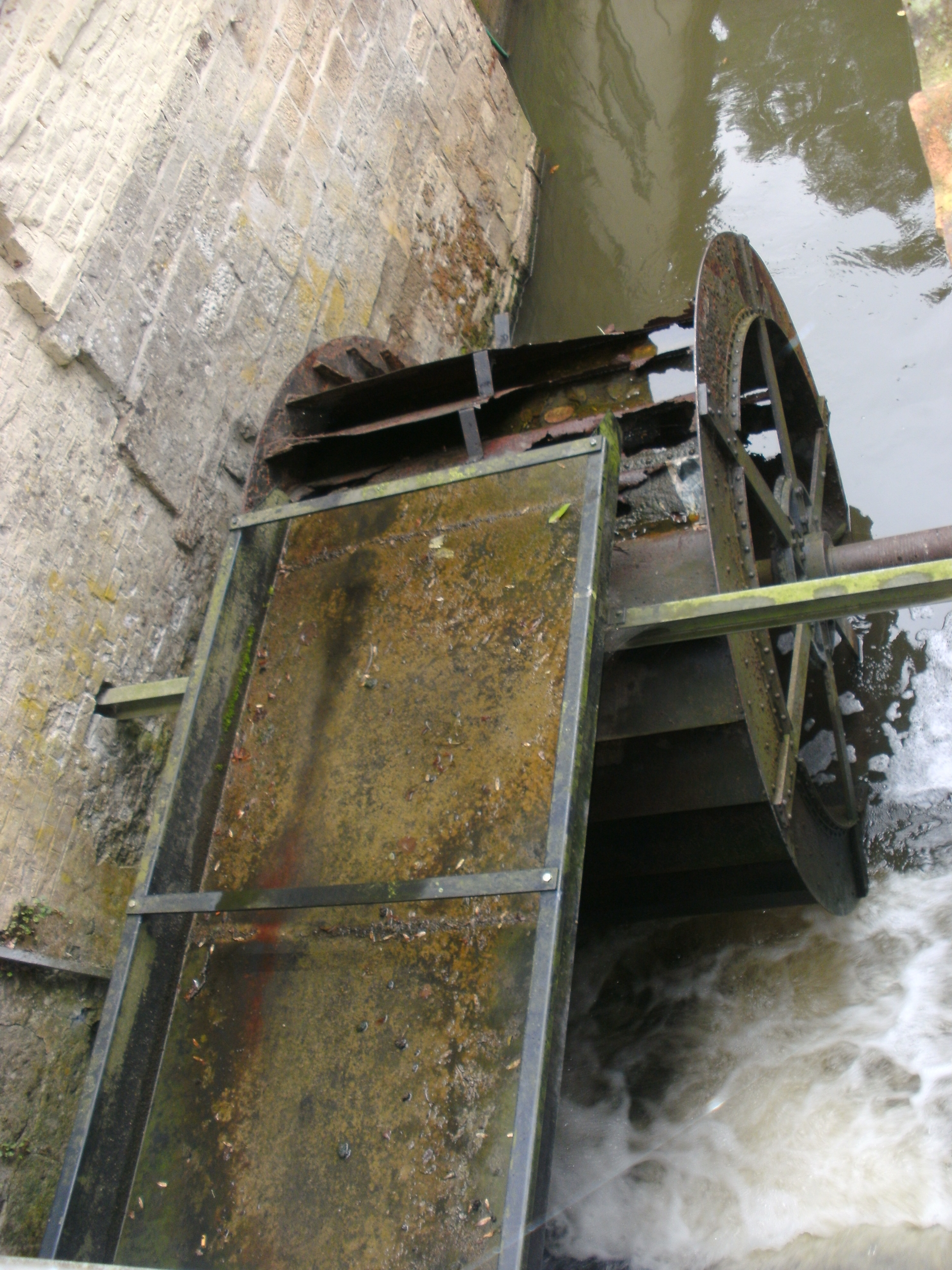
Mill wheel of the Cottemmolen at Erpe

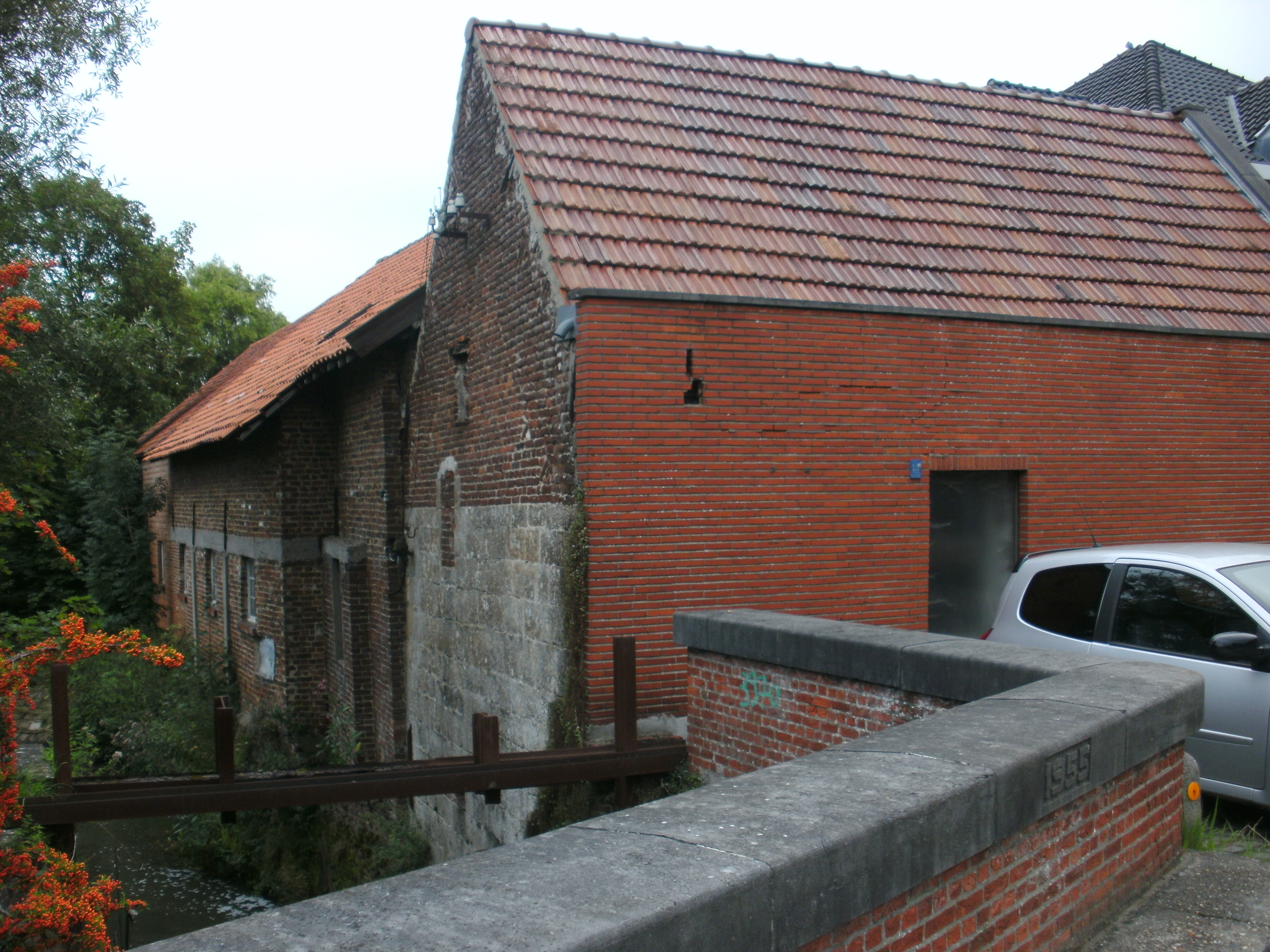
Van Der Biestmolen at Erpe

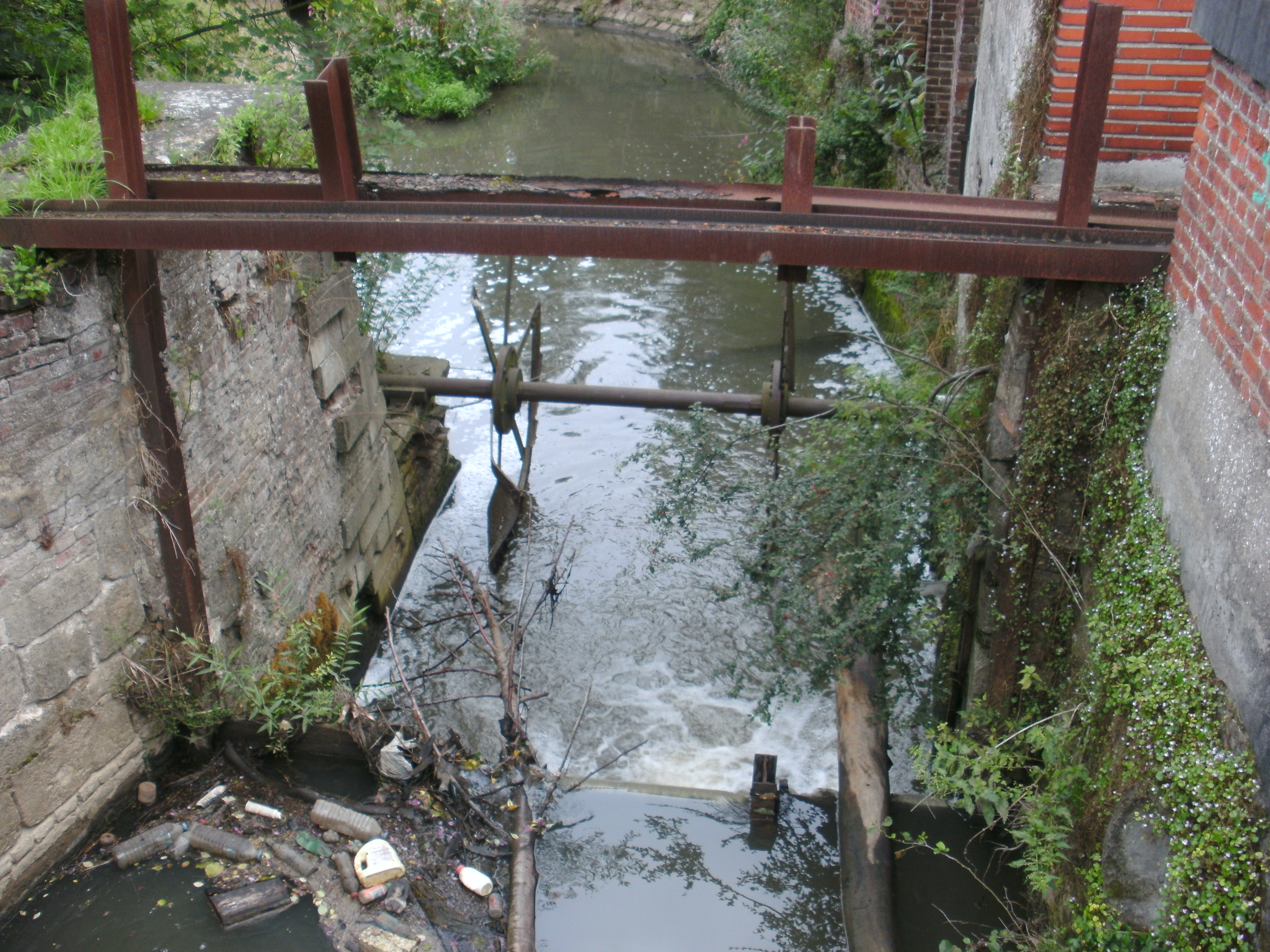
Mill wheel of the Van Der Biestmolen at Erpe

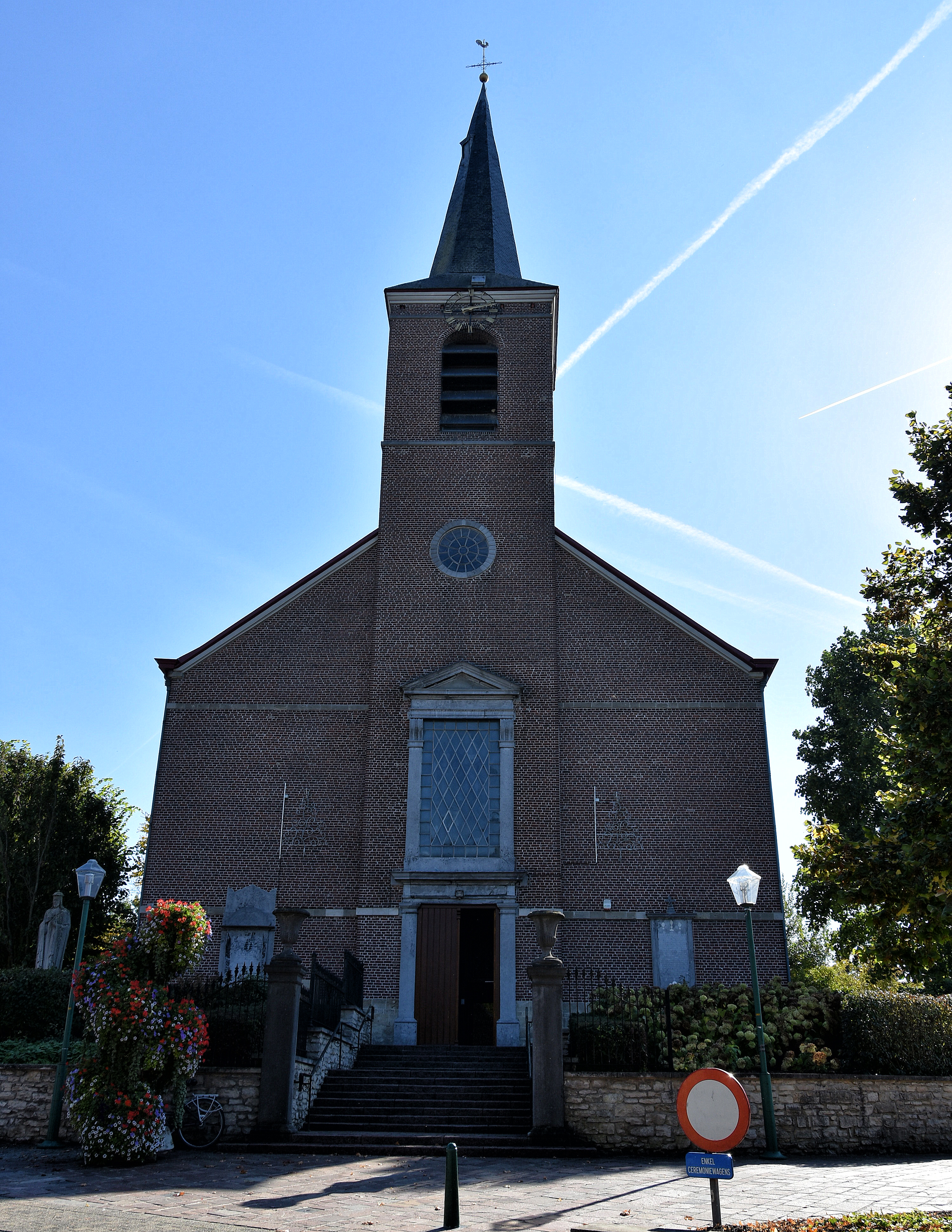
The church of Erpe

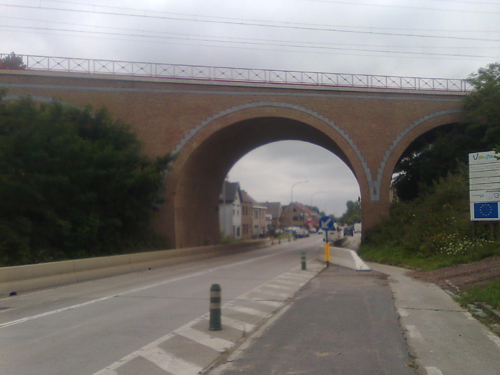
The railway bridge of Erpe over the Oudenaardsesteenweg

== Tourism ==
Through Erpe runs the Molenbeekroute. The Molenbeekroute is a cycle track network, known primarily for the mills of the municipality Erpe-Mere and two brooks that can be found there, which both have the name Molenbeek (mill brook).

== Sport ==
Erpe had two football clubs, FC Edixvelde and FC Oranja Erpe, at the Royal Belgian Football Association. The national clubhouse of the motorcycle club Blue Angels in Belgium is in Erpe.
