= Erpe-Mere =

- Municipality
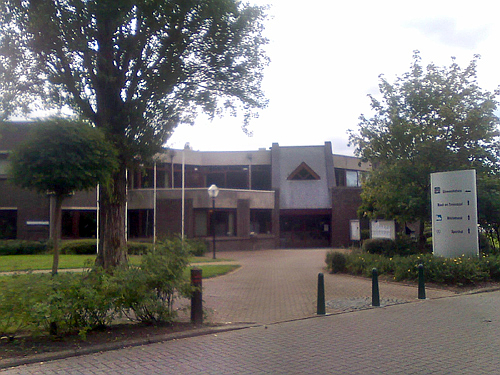
- Erpe-Mere town hall

- Flag Coat of arms

- Location of Erpe-Mere in East Flanders
- Interactive map of Erpe-Mere
- Location in Belgium
- Coordinates: 50°55′N 03°57′E
- Country: Belgium
- Community: Flemish Community
- Region: Flemish Region
- Province: East Flanders
- Arrondissement: Aalst

Government
  - Mayor: Hugo De Waele (CD&V)
  - Governing parties: CD&V, N-VA

Area
  - Total: 34.41 km^{2} (13.29 sq mi)

Population (2018-01-01)
  - Total: 19,857
  - Density: 577.1/km^{2} (1,495/sq mi)
- Postal codes: 9420 Aaigem; 9420 Bambrugge; 9420 Burst; 9420 Erondegem; 9420 Erpe; 9420 Mere; 9420 Ottergem; 9420 Vlekkem
- NIS code: 41082
- Area codes: 053
- Website: www.erpe-mere.be

Erpe-Mere (Dutch pronunciation: [ˌɛrpəˈmeːrə]) is a municipality located in the Belgian province of East Flanders in the Denderstreek. The municipality comprises the towns of Aaigem, Bambrugge, Burst, Erondegem, Erpe, Mere, Ottergem and Vlekkem. There is also a hamlet in Bambrugge: Egem. Erpe-Mere is crossed by 2 brooks, the Molenbeek and the Molenbeek-Ter Erpenbeek. In 2022 Erpe-Mere had a total population of 20,127. The total area is 34.03 km^{2}. The current mayor of Erpe-Mere is Hugo De Waele, from the CD&V (Christian Democratic) party.

== History ==
The municipality was formed in 1975 by the merger of the eight sub-municipalities of today, but the sub-communities Erpe and Mere initially disagreed on the new name for the merged municipality. While Erpe had the largest area, Mere was central in the entire area and had more inhabitants. As a compromise they choose the double name Erpe-Mere.

== Geography ==
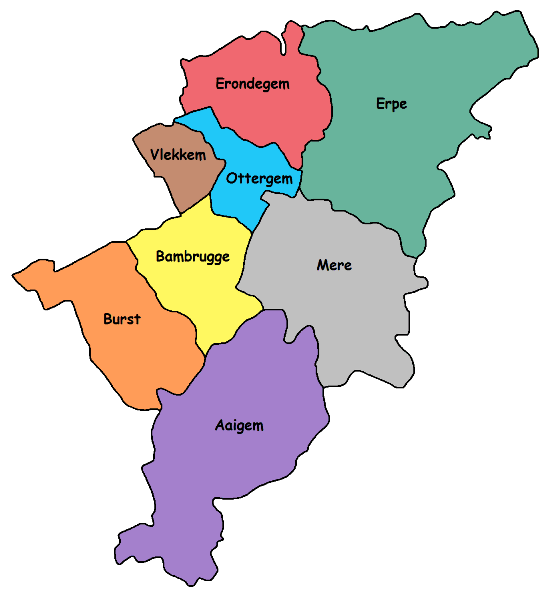
Map of Erpe-Mere showing the 8 subdivision parts

The municipality is bordered to the north by Lede, in the east by Aalst and Haaltert, in the south by Herzele and in the west by Sint-Lievens-Houtem. Erpe-Mere is located north of the foothills of the Flemish Ardennes, in the region Denderstreek. The area north of the N9 (Aalst-Ghent) is between 10 and 30 meters high, the area between the N9 and E40 (Brussels-Ghent) is between 25 and 50 meters high and the area south of it has hills peaks up to 80 meters. The most famous of them is the Gotegemberg in Mere, not for his height of 68 meters, but for its slope of 18% making it a popular challenge for cyclists.

The territory is traversed by two brooks that both bear the name Molenbeek. The Molenbeek from the Upper Scheldt crosses Burst, Bambrugge, Ottergem, Vlekkem and Erondegem before it flows into the Scheldt. The Molenbeek-Ter Erpenbeek flows into the Dender.

The Romans knew early there was white natural stone called Vlaamse Arduin or Lediaanse Steen in Steenberg of Bambrugge. This white natural stone was suitable as a foundation for the masonry of Roman villas and as building material for columns and capitals of the Roman temples. From about the 11th or 12th century there was already extracted white sandstone in Bambrugge (Steenberg). The common types of white natural stone in Brabant in the 16th to 17th Century were extracted in Steenberg. Extraction continued until after World War II. Today it is the administrative center of Erpe-Mere.

There is a 205 hectare nature reserve called Den Dotter in the sub-municipalities of Aaigem (municipality Erpe-Mere) and Heldergem (municipality Haaltert).

== Transportation ==
Erpe-Mere has an exit to the A10/E40 and a regional railway station on the railway line Kortrijk–Oudenaarde–Zottegem–Erpe-Mere–Aalst–Brussels. Also the N9 (Gentsesteenweg), the N442 (Leedsesteenweg) and the N46 (Oudenaardsesteenweg) cross the municipality.

== Landmarks ==
- The water tower of the Tussengemeentelijke Maatschappij der Vlaanderen voor Watervoorziening.

=== Mills ===
Landmarks include the mills of the municipality, through which runs the Denderroute South and the Molenbeekroute. Due to the geography of the area, there are eleven water mills in Erpe-Mere, with Erpe-Mere having the most water mills in Belgium, seven of which are protected by law. One mill was largely demolished, but there are still remains of this mill and the mill house is still intact. Another mill was also converted into a house. On the Koudenberg, one of the highest hills of the community, there is a windmill that is protected by law. It was re-mounted on its base in 2006 after being restored in 2004 by a studio in Roeselare. The Kruiskoutermolen was restored in 2006 and is operational. It can be visited by appointment with the tourist service.

Place	Name(s)	Address	Type	Protected	Info
Aaigem	Engelsmolen; Molen te Dalhem; Molen te Dalme	Engelsmolen 1	Overshot watermill	Yes	It was originally a wheat mill, oil mill and a flax attrition mill Later on it was only a wheat mill
Aaigem	Ratmolen; Waterrat	Ratmolenstraat 42	Overshot watermill	Yes	It was originally a wheat mill and an oil mill Later on it was only a wheat mill
Aaigem	Zwingelmolen	Aaigembergstraat 10	Overshot watermill	No	It was originally a flax attrition mill Later on it became a chicory mill The mill wheel has been removed It has been renovated as a house
Bambrugge	Egemmolen; Meuleken Tik Tak	Everdal 21	Overshot watermill	No	Wheat mill The mill wheel has been removed The mill house is used as a country cottage
Bambrugge	Molens Van Sande; Kasteelmolen; Celindermolen	Prinsdaal 33	Overshot watermill	No	It was originally a wheat mill and a compulsion mill Later on it was just a wheat mill The mill wheel has been removed It is now an industrial flour mill
Erpe	Cottemmolen	Molenstraat 36	Overshot watermill	Yes	It was originally a wheat mill and an oil mill Later on it was only a wheat mill
Erpe	Van Der Biestmolen	Dorpsstraat 3	Overshot watermill	No	Wheat mill
Mere	De Graevesmolen	Bosstraat 25	Overshot watermill	Yes	Wheat mill and an oil mill
Mere	Gotegemmolen	Gotegemstraat 1	Overshot watermill	Yes	Wheat mill
Mere	Kruiskoutermolen; Jezuïtenmolen; Molen Van Der Haegen	Schoolstraat	Post windmill with open foot	Yes	Wheat mill
Mere	Molen te Broeck 't Hof Schuurke	Wilgendries 6	Overshot watermill	Yes	Wheat mill
Ottergem	De Watermeulen	Ruststraat 10-12	Overshot watermill	Yes	It was originally a wheat mill and an oil mill Later on it was only a wheat mill

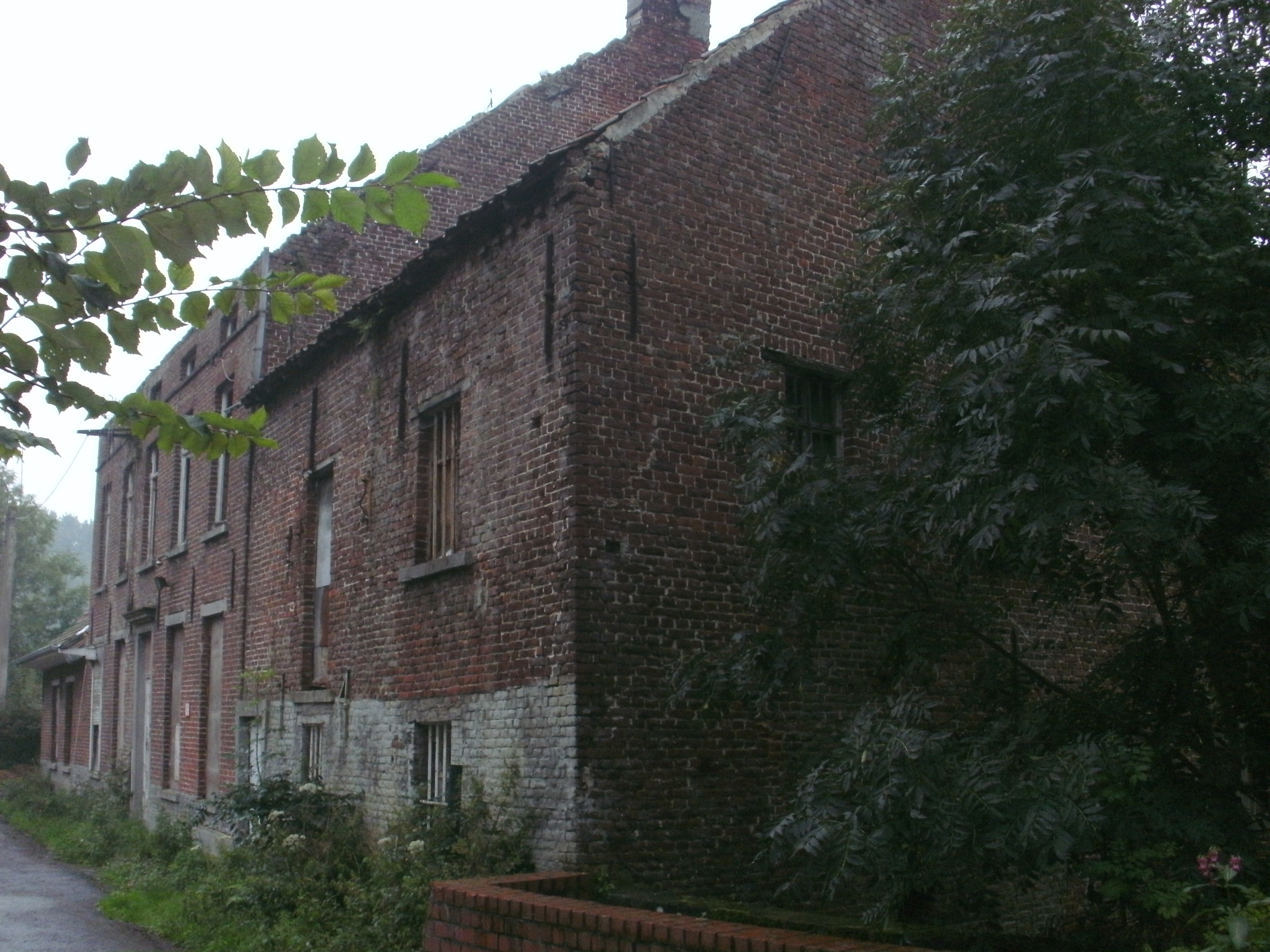
Engelsmolen at Aaigem

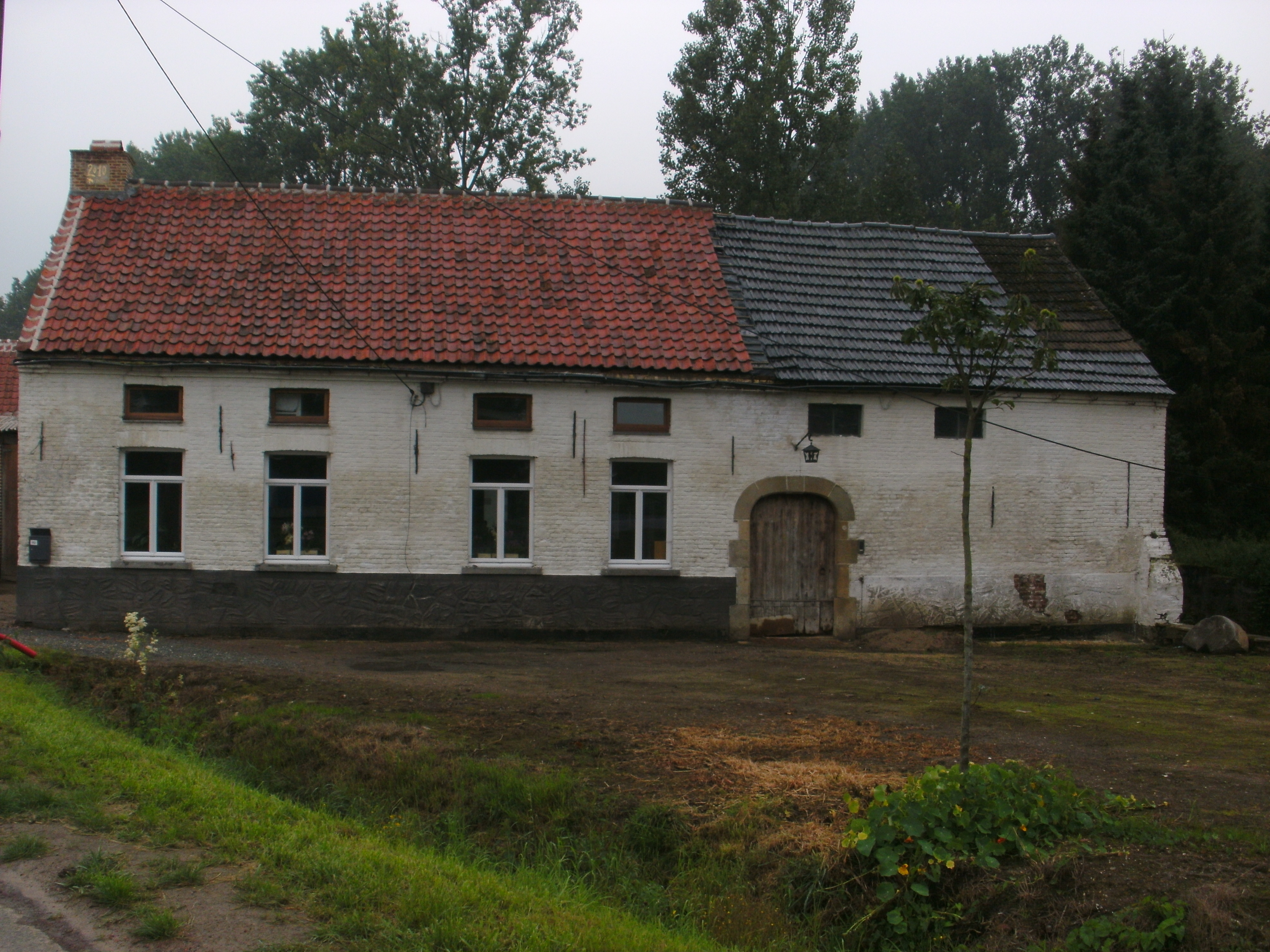
Ratmolen at Aaigem

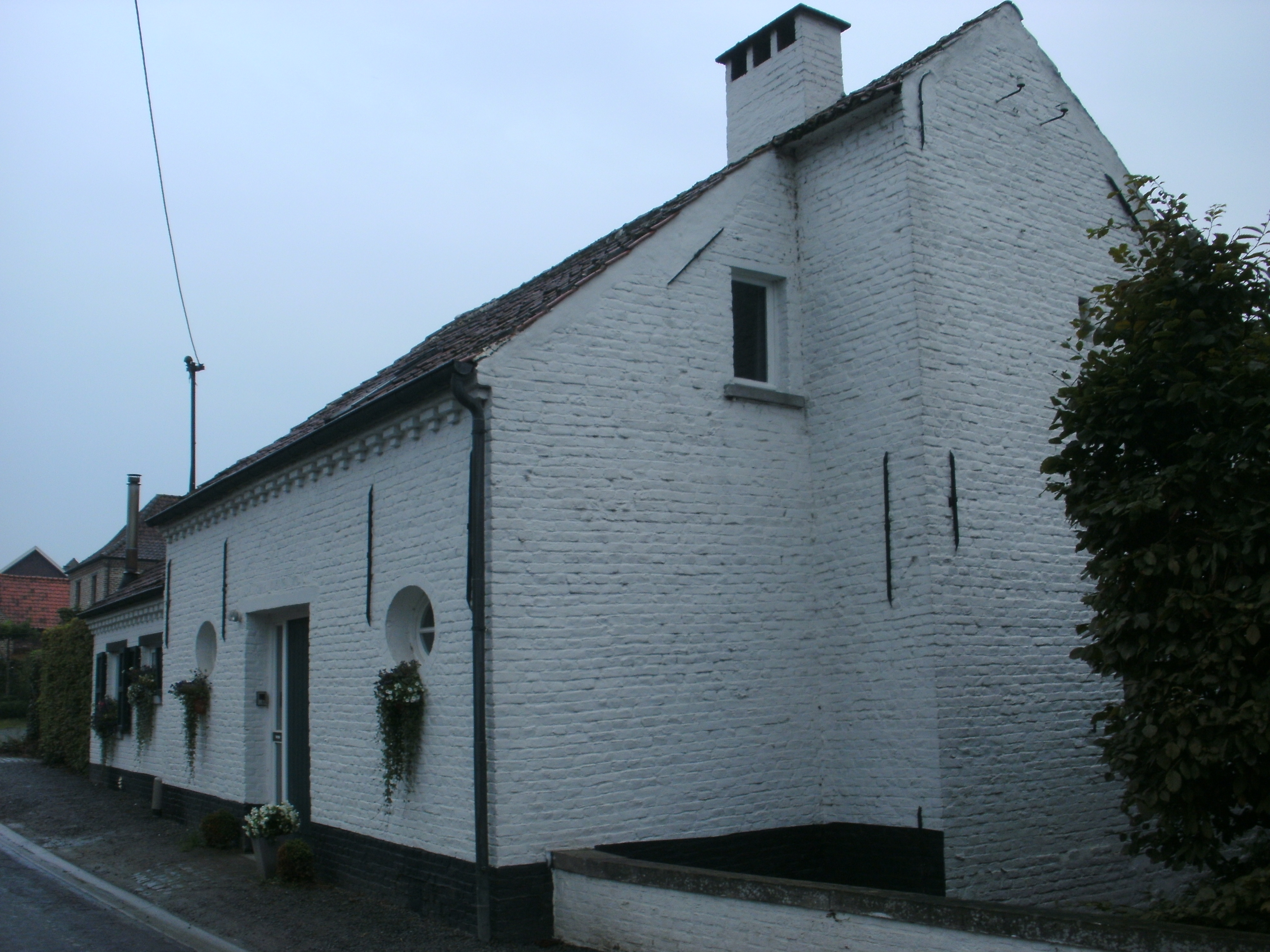
Zwingelmolen at Aaigem

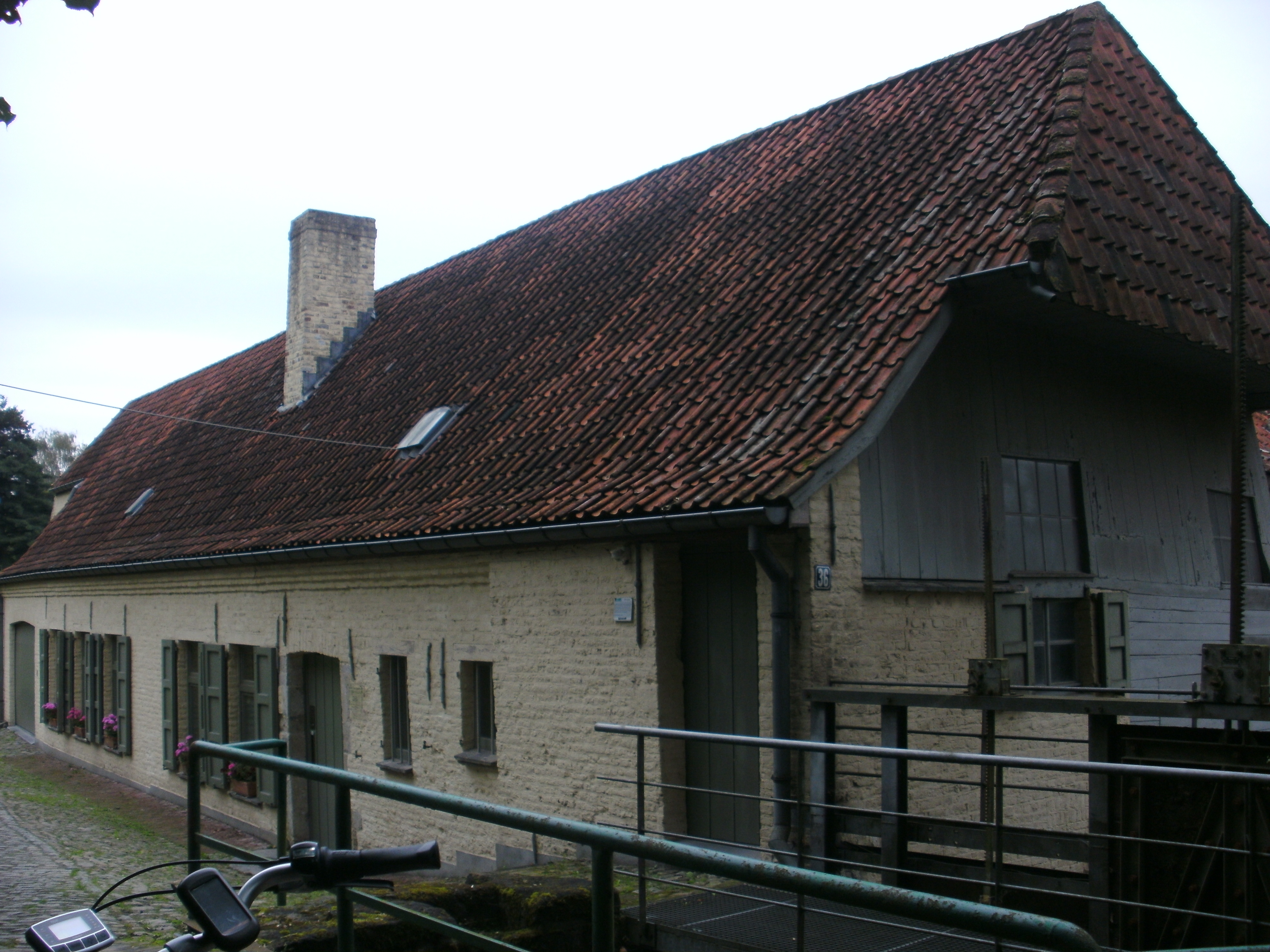
Front view of the Cottemmolen at Erpe

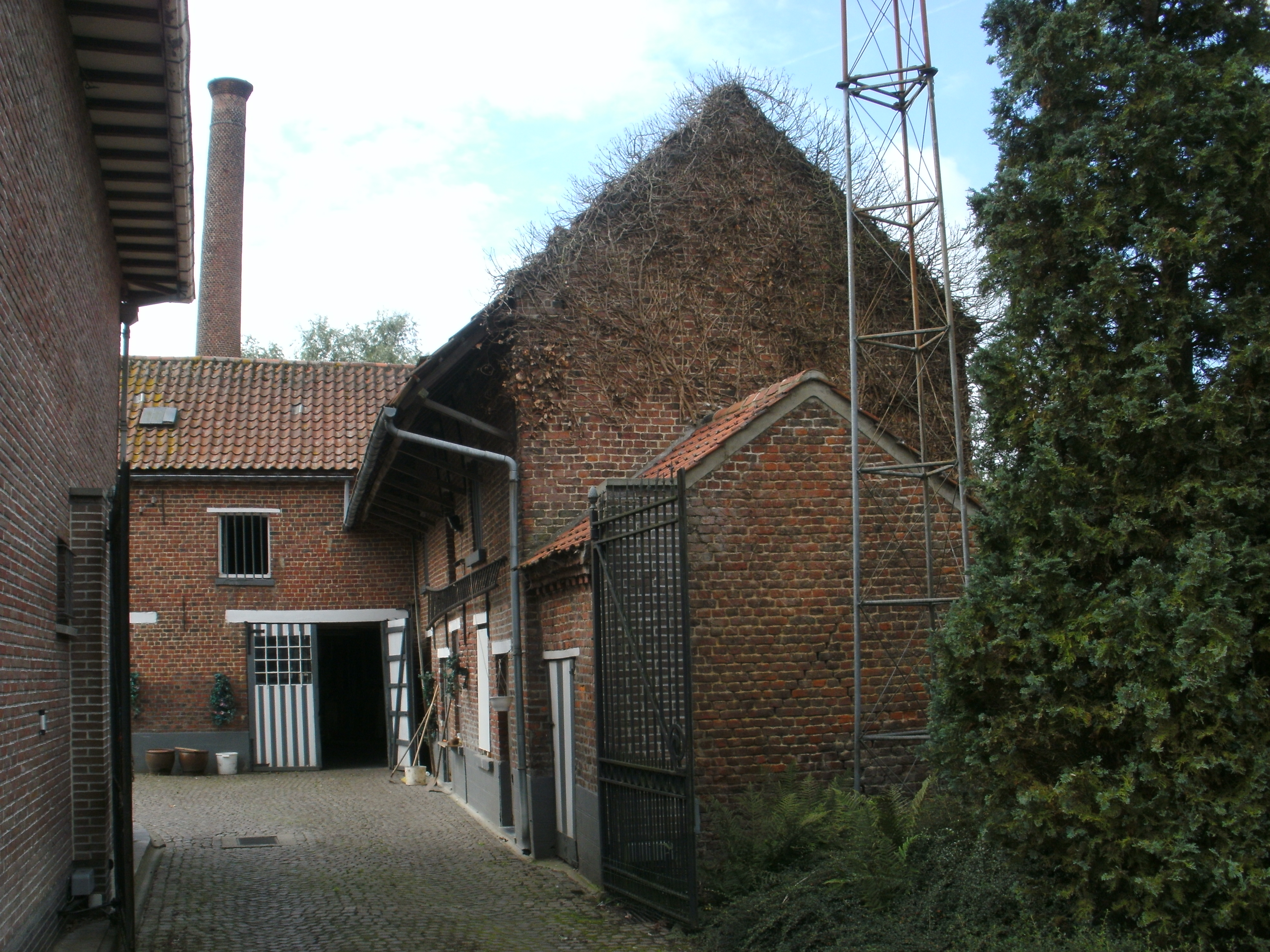
Front view of the De Graevesmolen at Mere

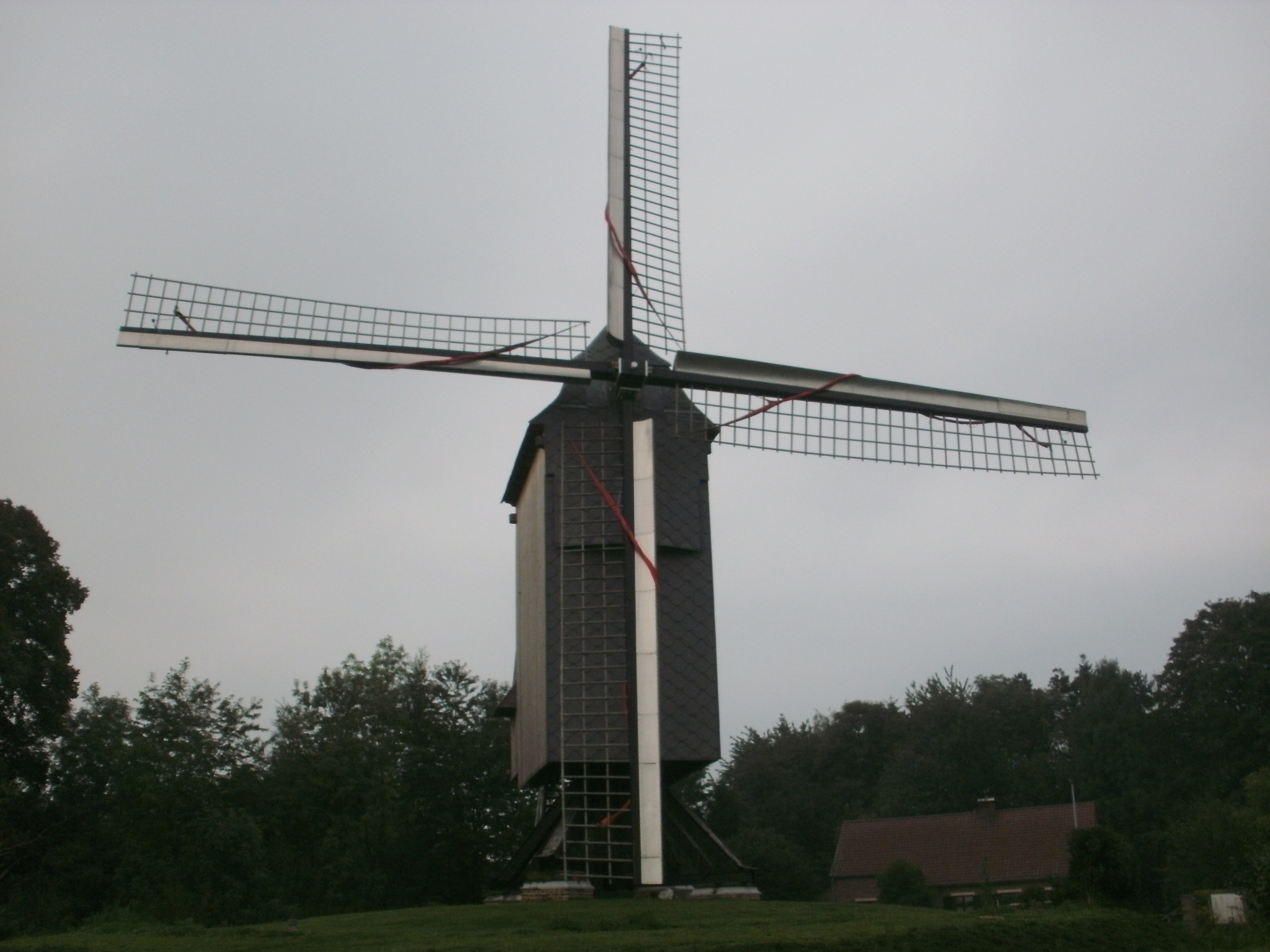
Kruiskoutermolen at Mere

== Sports ==
Erpe-Mere once had seven football clubs that belonged to the Royal Belgian Football Association. There are still four left: KRC Bambrugge, KFC Olympic Burst, FC Mere and SK Aaigem. FC Edixvelde was absorbed by FC Mere. FC Oranja Erpe and KFC Olympia Erondegem merged into KVC Erperondegem that was some years later also absorbed by FC Mere.

Each year the Steenbergcross, the first international cyclo-cross race of the season, is held at Steenberg in Bambrugge. The national clubhouse of the motorcycle club Blue Angels in Belgium is located in Erpe.

== Image gallery ==
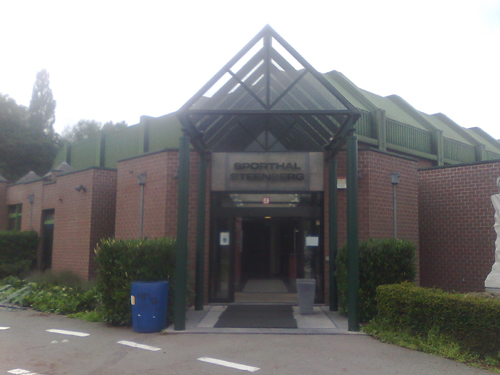
The sports hall of Erpe-Mere, at Steenberg in Bambrugge

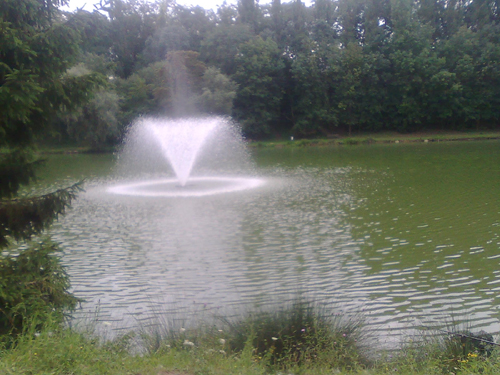
The pool of Steenberg in Bambrugge

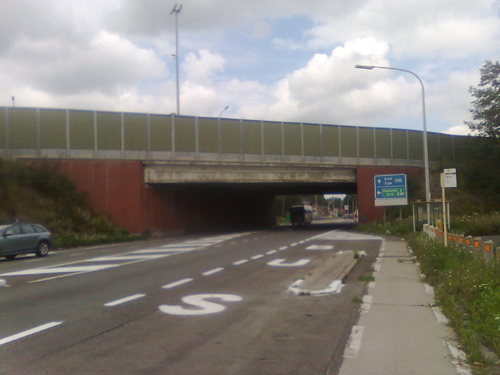
The motorway bridge (E40) of Mere over the Oudenaardsesteenweg

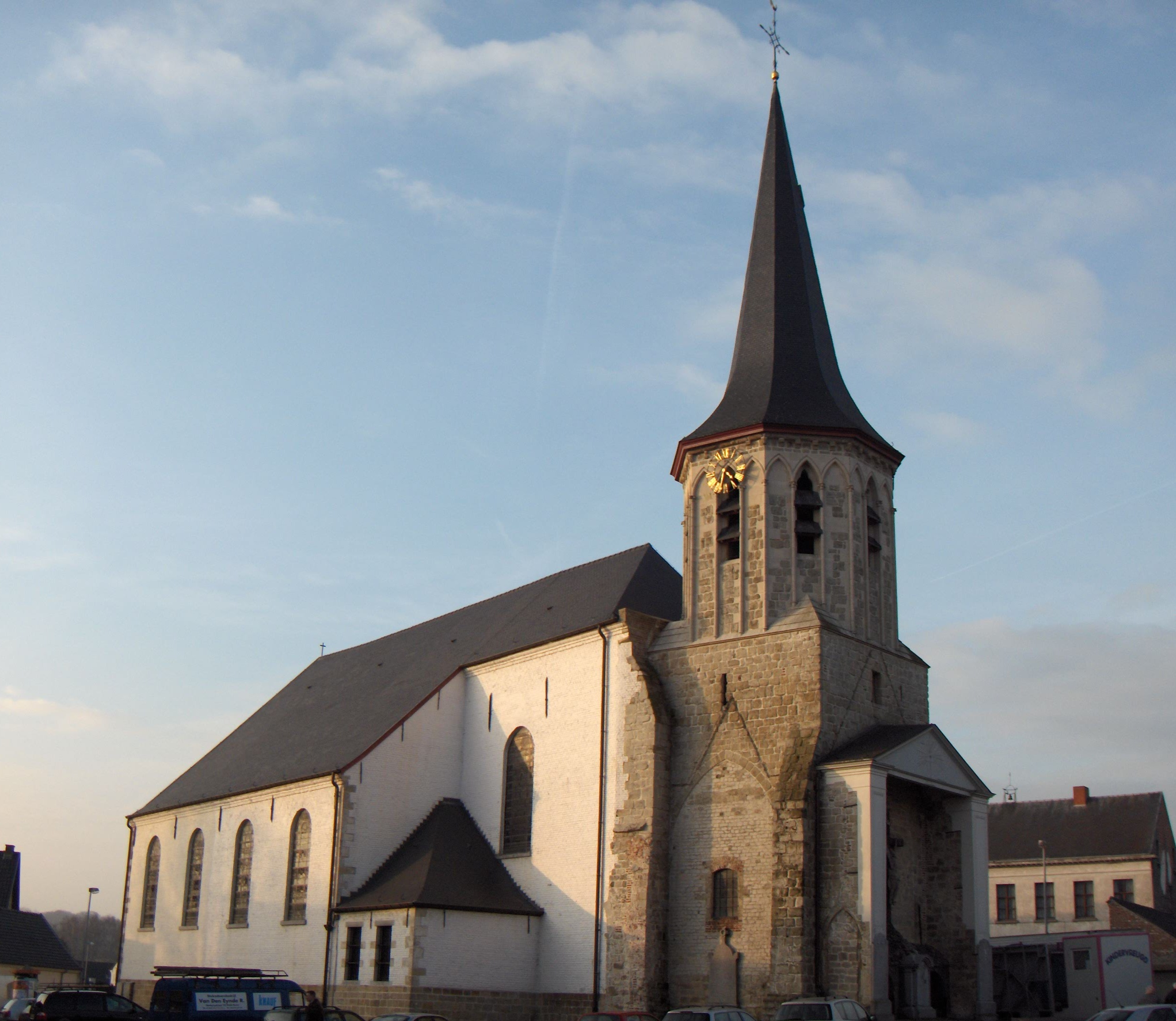
Church of Aaigem

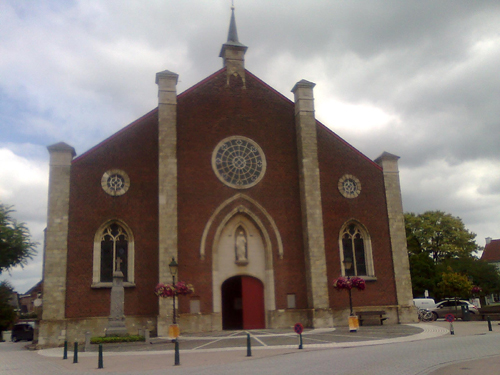
Church of Mere
