= Den Dotter =

- Nature reserve
- Den Dotter in Aaigem and Heldergem
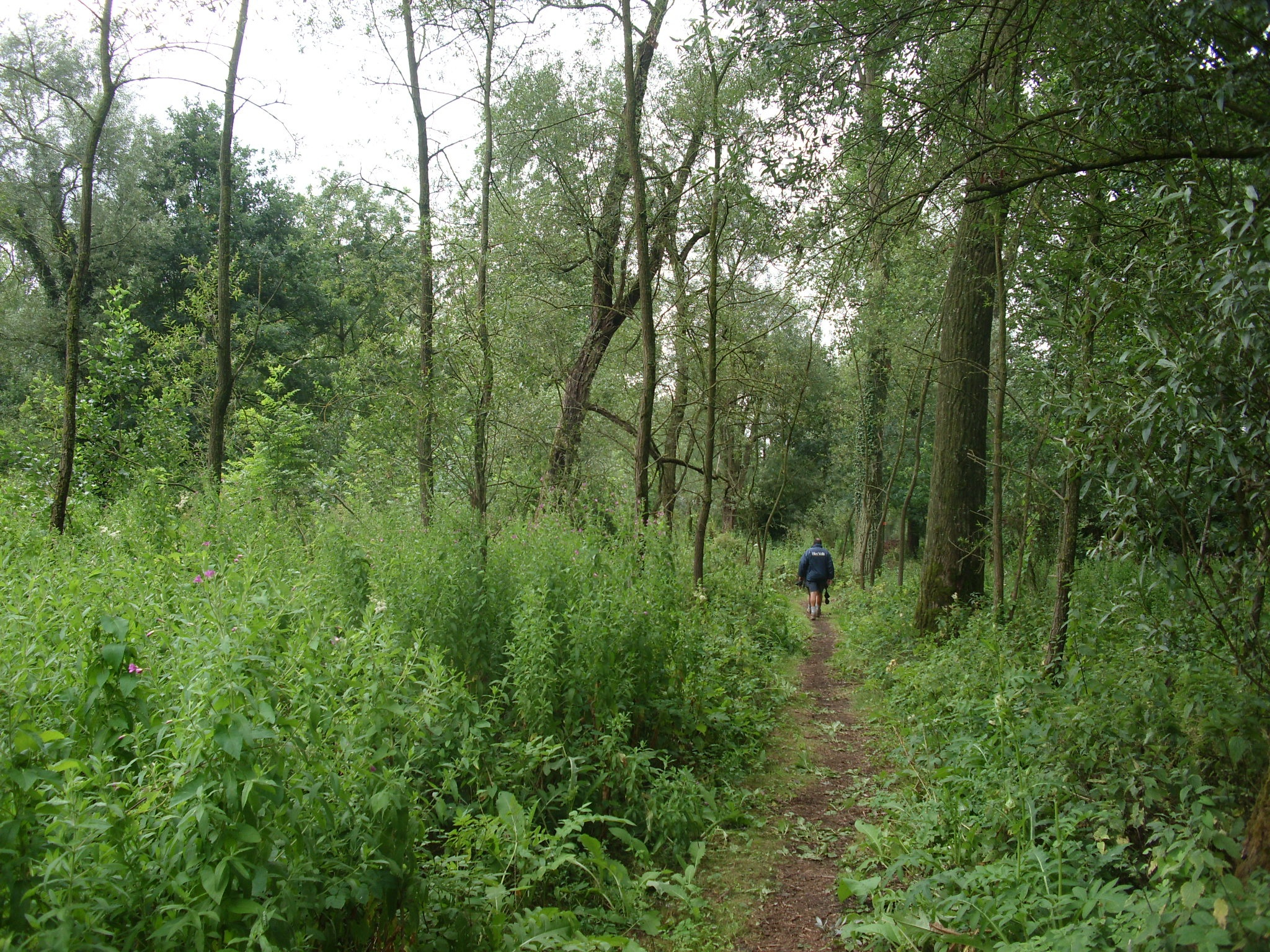

- Location within Belgium
- Coordinates: 50°53′58″N 3°57′53″E
- Country: Belgium
- Region: Flanders
- Province: East Flanders
- Arrondissement: Aalst
- Municipality: Erpe-Mere and Haaltert
- Sub-municipality: Aaigem and Heldergem

Area
  - Total: 2.05 km^{2} (0.79 sq mi)
- Postal code: 9420 Aaigem; 9450 Heldergem
- Area code: 053

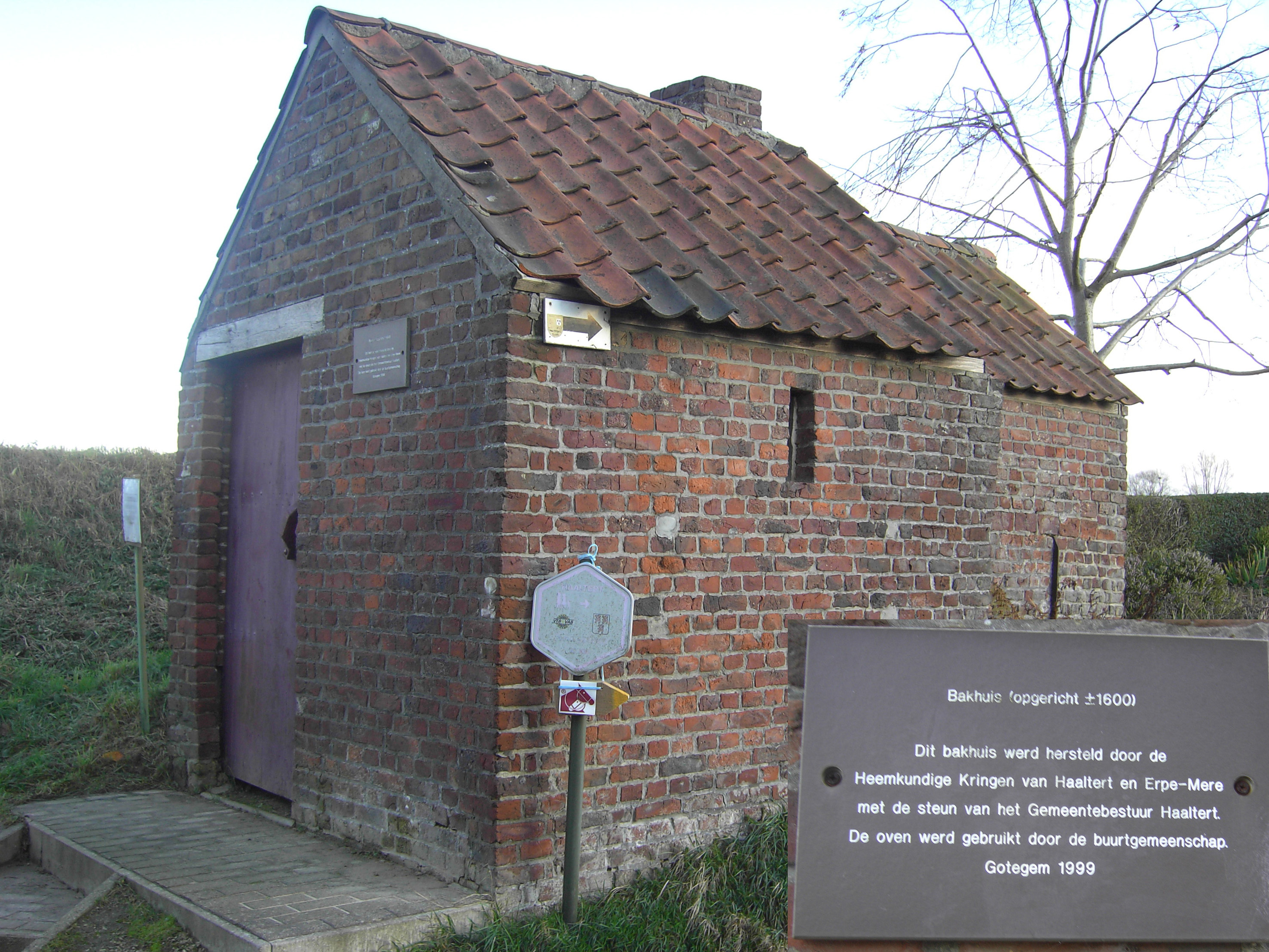
Bakehouse in Den Dotter

Den Dotter is a 205 hectare nature reserve in the sub-municipalities of Aaigem (municipality Erpe-Mere) and Heldergem (municipality Haaltert) in the East Flemish Denderstreek, Belgium.

It is a swampy, almost uninhabited area, with the central brook (beek) Molenbeek-Ter Erpenbeek, named for its numerous mills (molens).

The Dotter is crossed by several hiking and cycleways, the hiking path "Den Dotter" starts at the Church of Aaigem. The path's distance is 10 km and at the district of Gotegem, there is an old mill that can be visited. The steam follows an erratic course and has a lush flora of over 300 species of plants. A paved road runs through the area to avoid visitor's getting wet feet when walking.

The management is primarily engaged in harvesting and replanting of trees, providing good drainage and mowing lawns with the ubiquitous marsh marigold. Marsh marigold means dotterbloem (bloem meaning flower) in Dutch and so Den Dotter is derived from the word dotterbloem.
