= Aaigem =

Coordinates: 50.8891°N 3.372°E

- Village
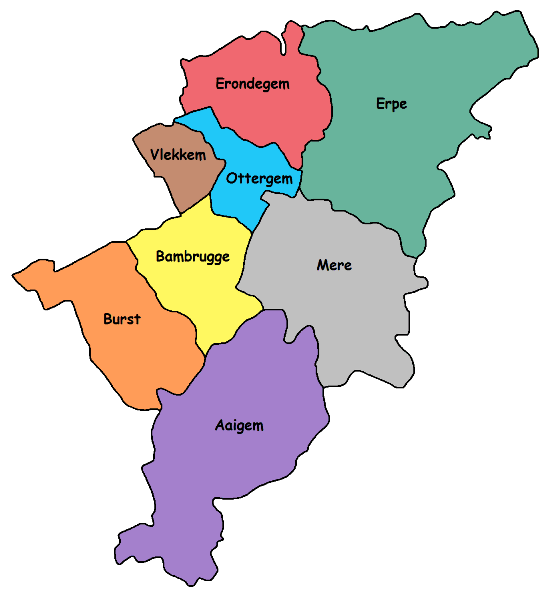
- Localisation of Aaigem in Erpe-Mere

- Coat of arms

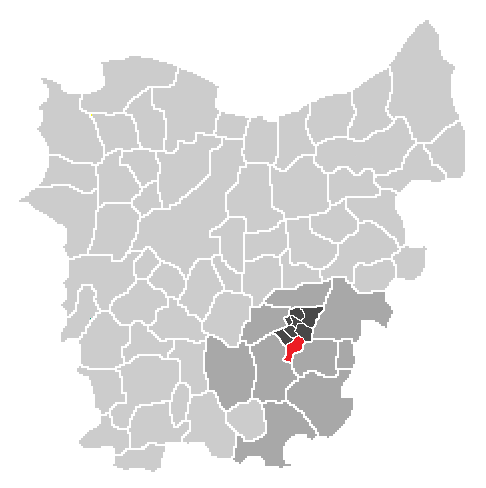
- Localisation of Aaigem in the community of Erpe-Mere in the arrondissement of Aalst in the province of East-Flanders.
- Country: Belgium
- Region: Flanders
- Province: East Flanders
- Arrondissement: Aalst
- Municipality: Erpe-Mere

Area
  - Total: 7.32 km^{2} (2.83 sq mi)
- Elevation: 0 m (0 ft)

Population (2006)
  - Total: 2,098
  - Density: 287/km^{2} (742/sq mi)
- Source: NIS
- Postal code: 9420

Aaigem is a village belonging to the municipality of Erpe-Mere. It is located in the province of East Flanders, Belgium. The village has some 2000 inhabitants. Aaigem was an independent municipality with an area of 7.32 square kilometers till 1976.

== Geography ==
Aaigem is located north of the Flemish Ardennes, a hilly region, and is also a part of the Denderstreek. The village is situated on the north of the valley of Molenbeek-Ter Erpenbeek, a brook passing south of the village centre. Since the valley is characterized by low wet land, construction development is rather limited there.

The village centre of Aaigem is situated about 53 meters above sea level, with the Molenbeek brook being about 30 meters above sea level. The highest point within Aaigem is 77.8 meters above sea level, and is located in Opaaigem. It is also the highest point of the municipality of Erpe-Mere. The lowest point is 27 meters, and is located at the bottom of the Gotegemberg Hill. As such, the maximum height interval is 50 meters.

There is a 205 hectare nature reserve called Den Dotter in the sub-municipalities of Aaigem (municipality Erpe-Mere) and Heldergem (municipality Haaltert).

== Name ==
Etymologically, Flemish toponyms ending with –gem refer to a Germanic compound of –haim, meaning 'home' or 'residence', and a derivative ending –inga. The first part of the name "Aaigem" is commonly assigned to the Germanic name of Ago, a currently unknown person. In its totality, the compound Agingahaim meant 'residence of the followers or tribal members of Ago'. Gem-toponyms are typical for the period of Frankish settlement during the Merovingian era, though nothing is known about the village of Aaigem at that time, with the earliest records about the Aaigem dating back to the 11th century.

== History ==
The territory of Aaigem might have belonged to the Abbey of Saint Peter or the Abbey of Saint Bavo in Ghent before the forays of the Norsemen. From around 1100, the church of Aaigem was property of the Anchin Abbey (in Pecquencourt, near Douai in northern France). This abbey held much of the land in Aaigem till the French Revolution. Agriculture remained the main source of income throughout the 20th century. However, some industrial activity, such as water mill operation, have taken place. The limited rural industry that came into existence in the 19th and 20th century, such as a number of local dairy farms, have not survived.

In the feudal period Aaigem belonged to the Land of Aalst, and within this area, it was part of the Land of Haaltert, later also called Land of Rotselaar, in reference to the Lords of Rotselaar, who remained liege of this fief for generations.

== Landmarks ==
Aaigem is one of the few villages in Flanders with a preserved Frankish village green (Dutch: dries), located about 1 kilometer east from the present village center.

=== Mills ===
Three water mills have been preserved. All of them are located on the Molenbeek Brook, and are called, the Engelsmolen, the Ratmolen and the Zwingelmolen. The oldest records of the Engelsmolen and the Ratmolen date back to the 16th century, but the current buildings date from the 19th century. In 1870, a steam engine was installed in the Engelsmolen, but all activity was ceased in 1956. The Zwingelmolen has been converted into a house.

Name(s)	Address	Type	Protected	Info
Engelsmolen; Molen te Dalhem; Molen te Dalme	Engelsmolen 1	Overshot watermill	Yes	It was originally a wheat mill, oil mill and a flax attrition mill Later on only wheat mill
Ratmolen; Waterrat	Ratmolenstraat 42	Overshot watermill	Yes	It was originally a wheat mill and an oil mill Later on only wheat mill
Zwingelmolen	Aaigembergstraat 10	Overshot watermill	No	It was originally a flax attrition mill Later on it became a chicory mill The mill wheel has been removed Now renovated as a house

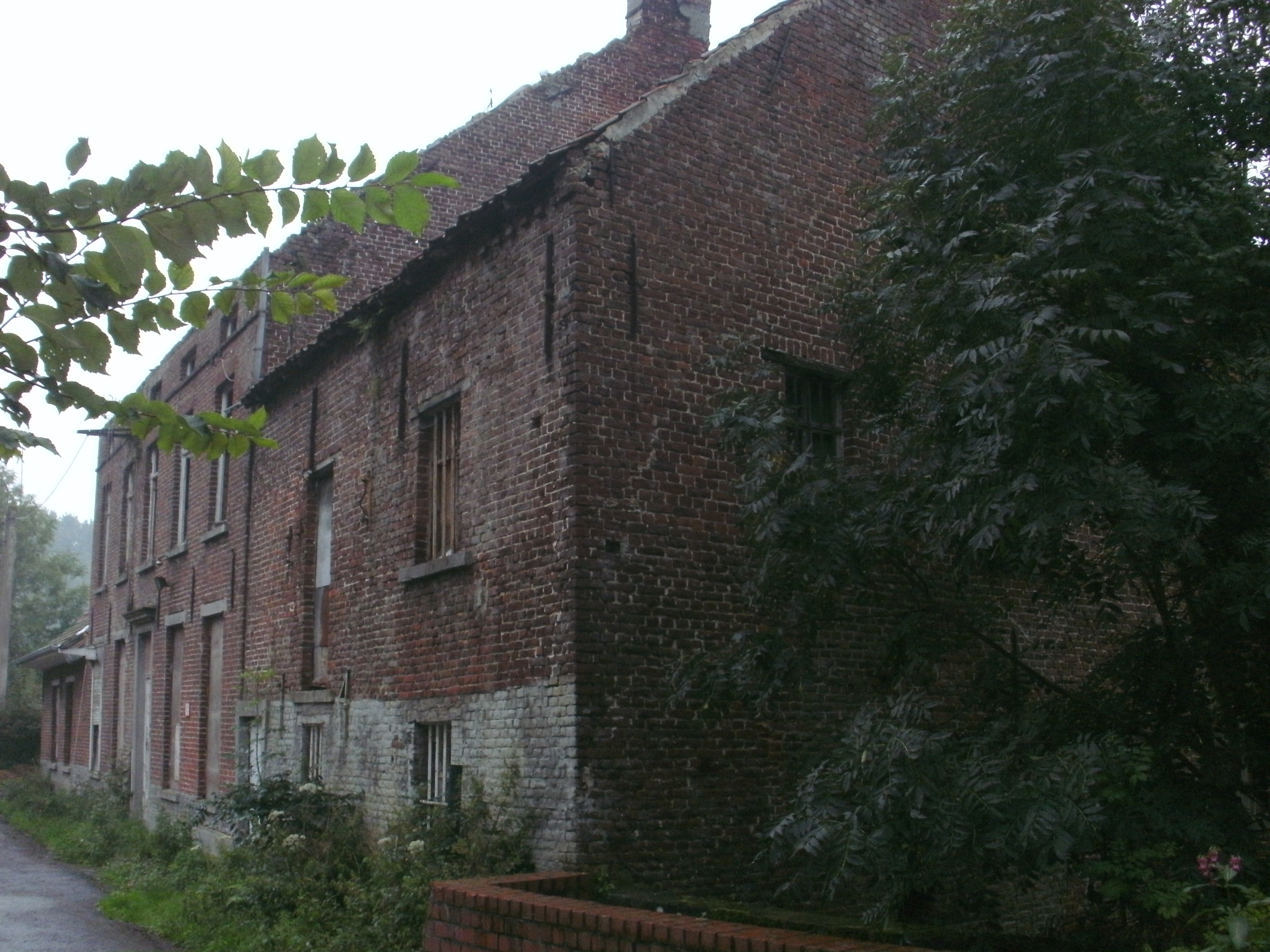
Engelsmolen at Aaigem

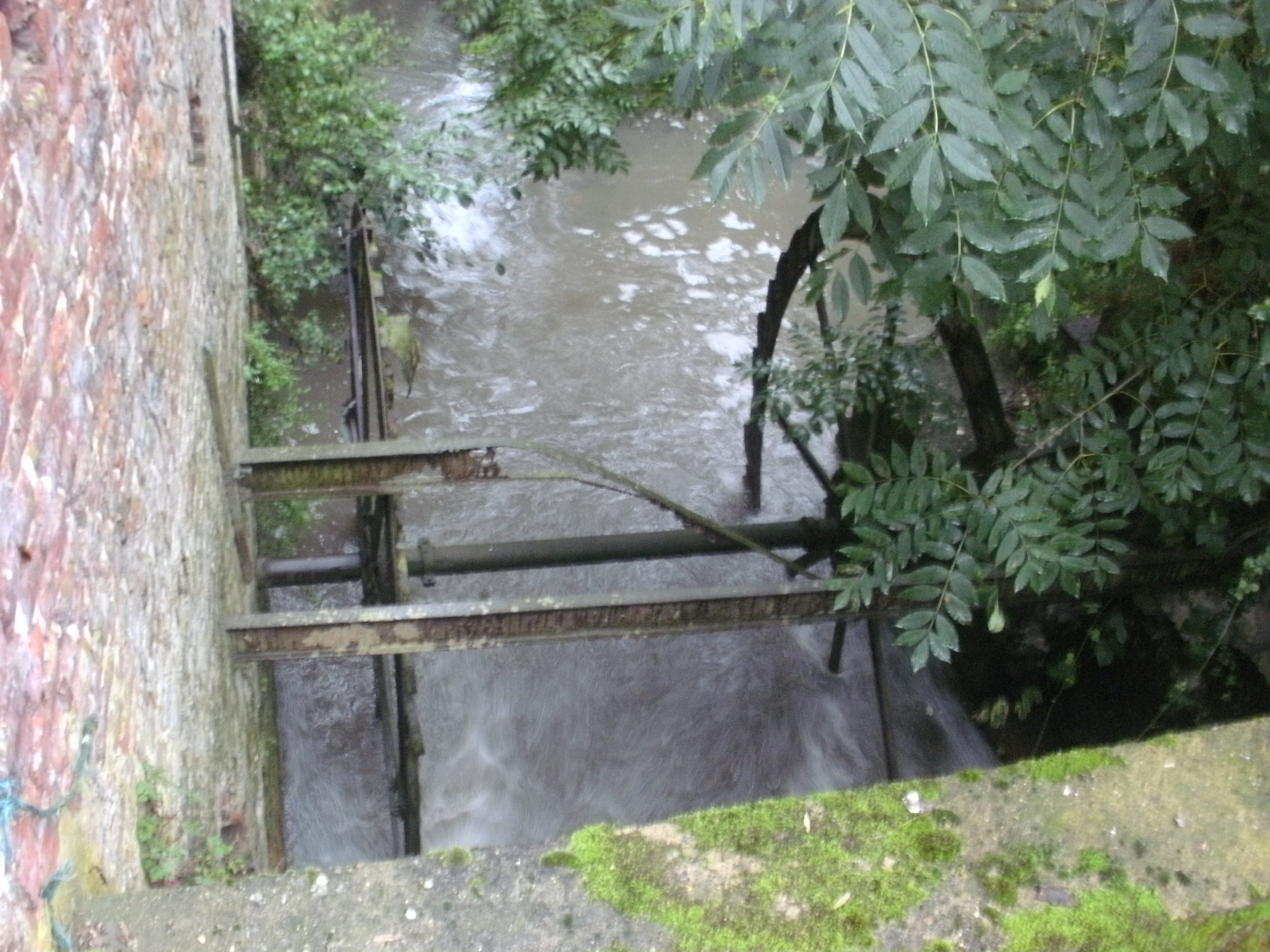
Mill wheel of the Engelsmolen at Aaigem

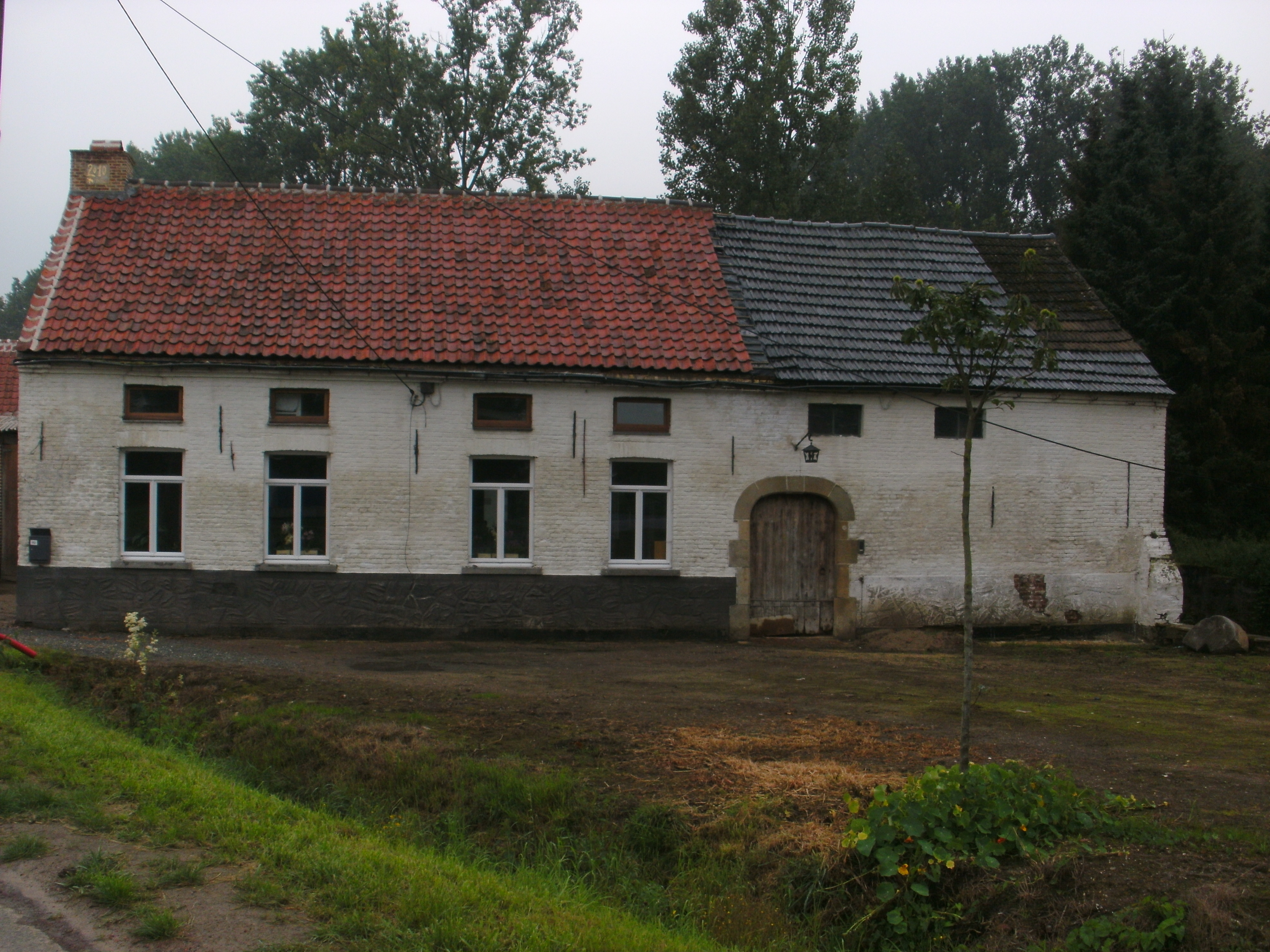
Ratmolen at Aaigem

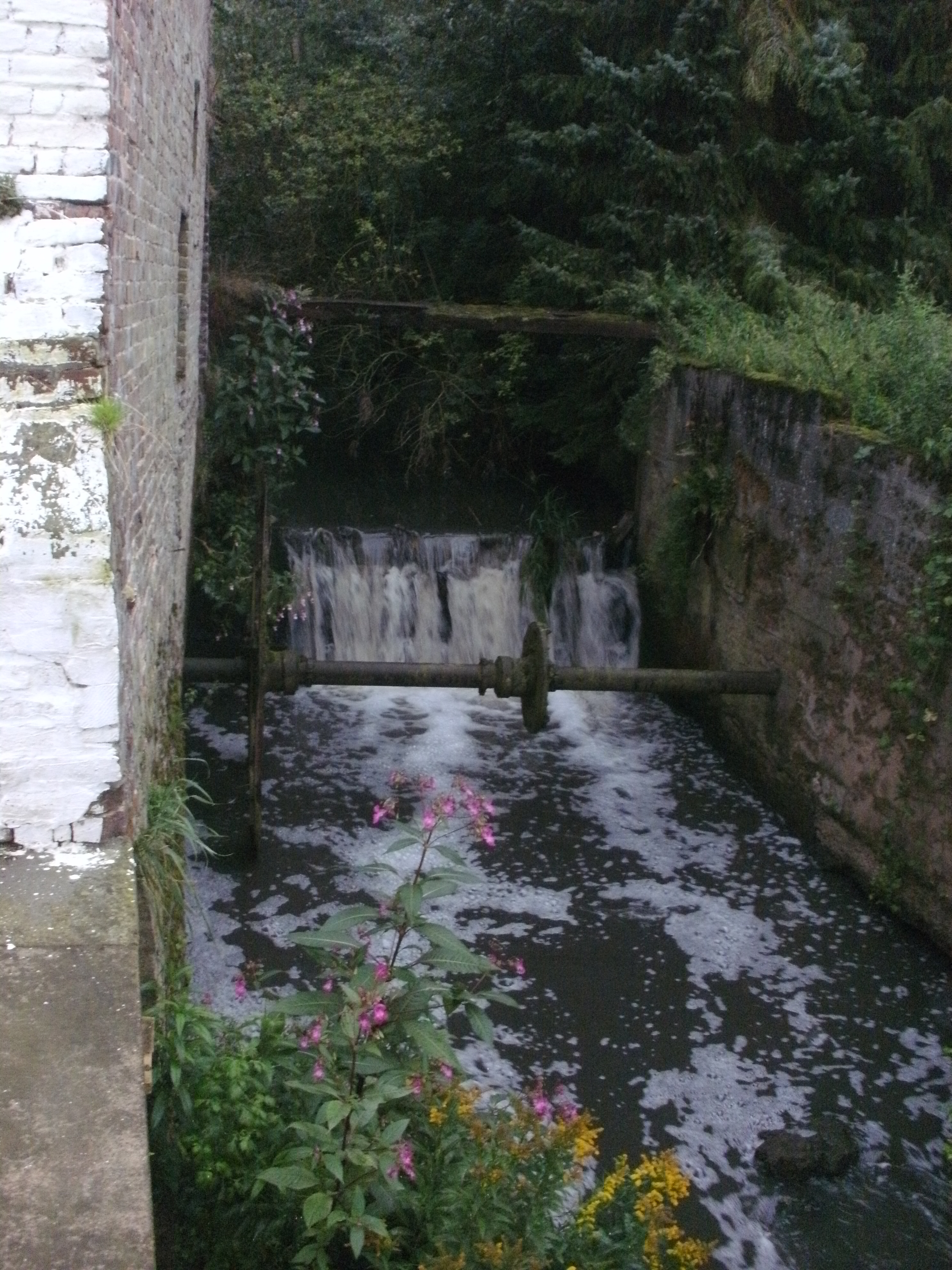
Mill wheel of the Ratmolen at Aaigem

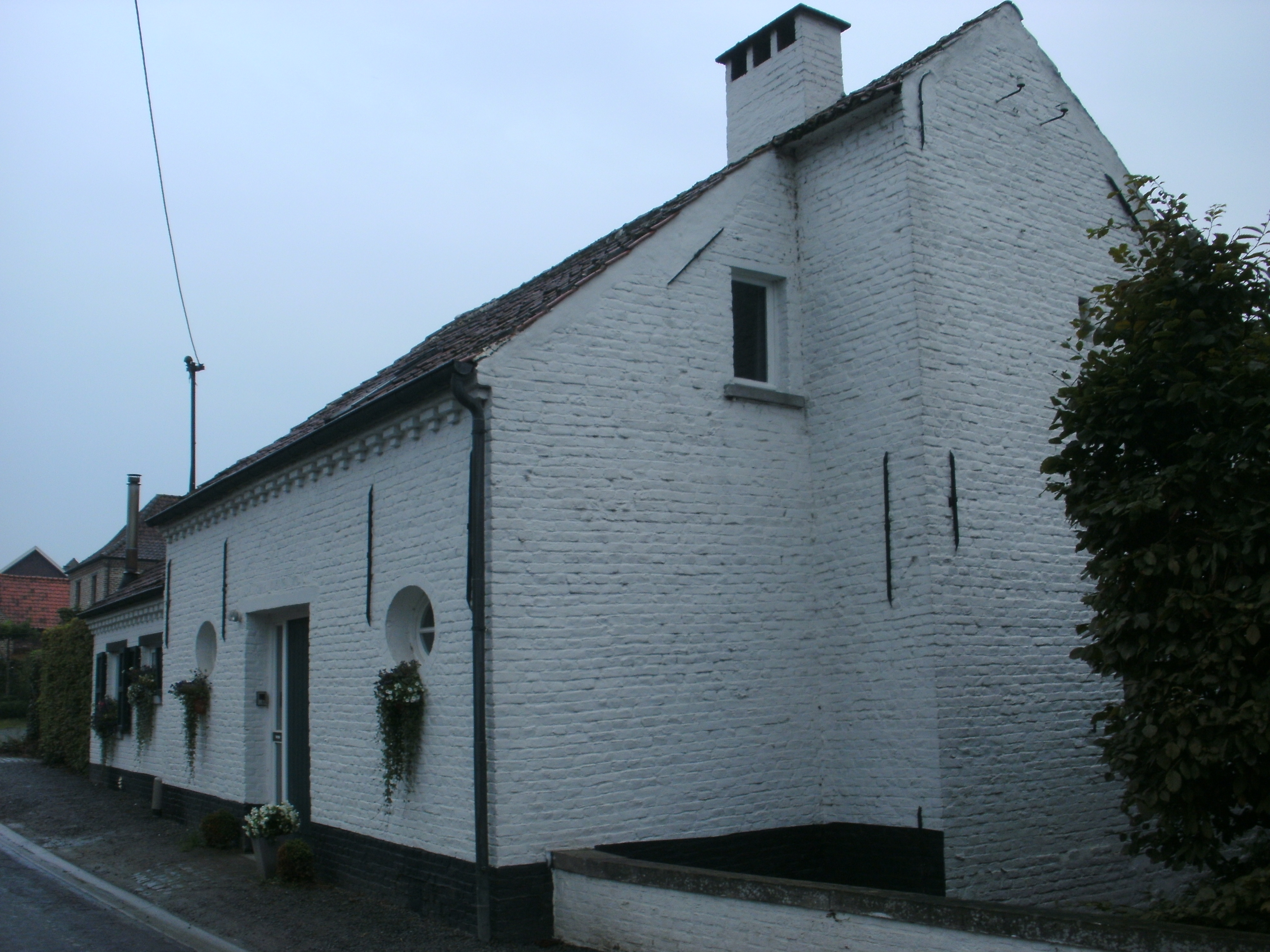
Zwingelmolen at Aaigem

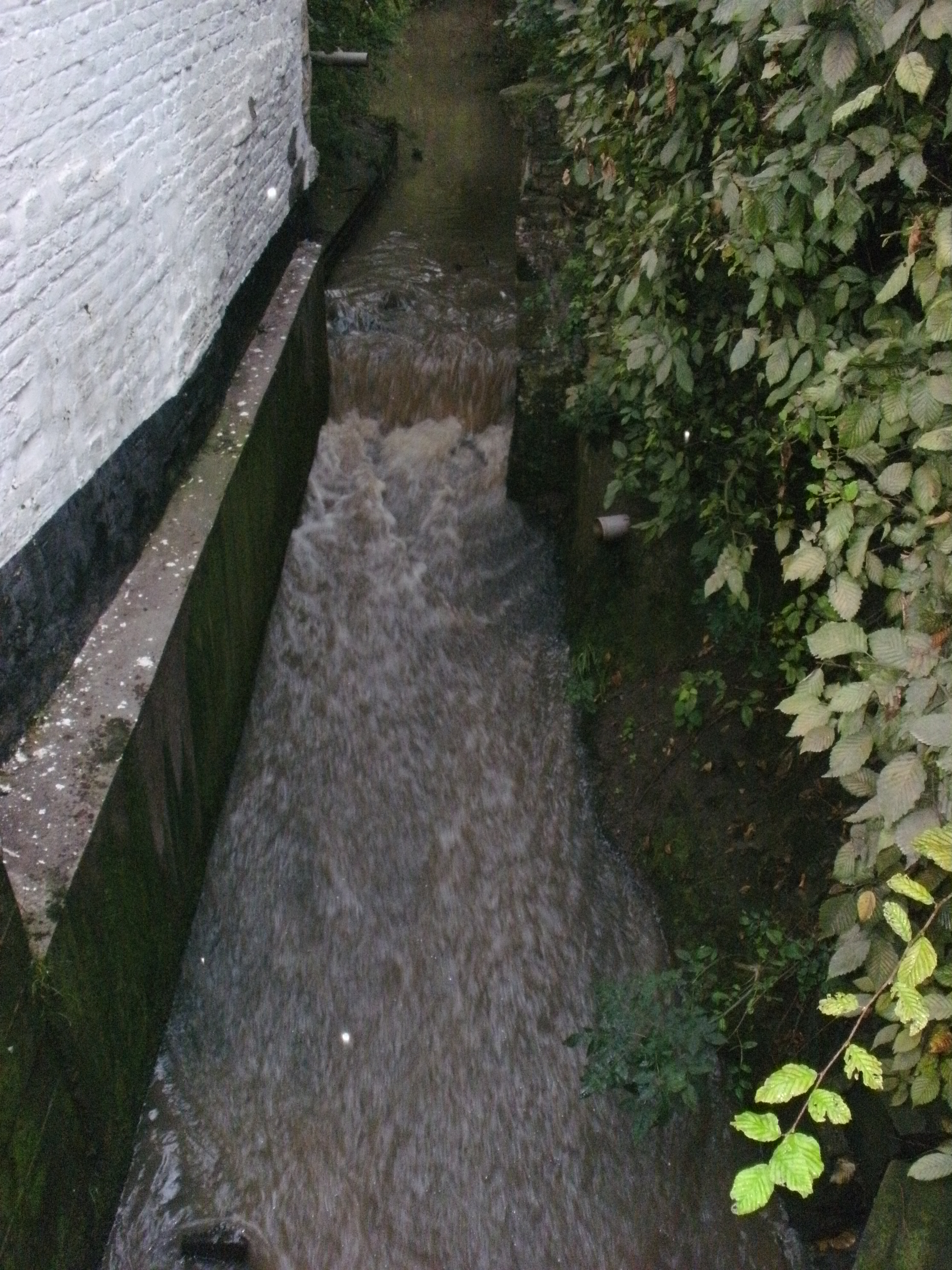
Place where the mill wheel of the Zwingelmolen was at Aaigem

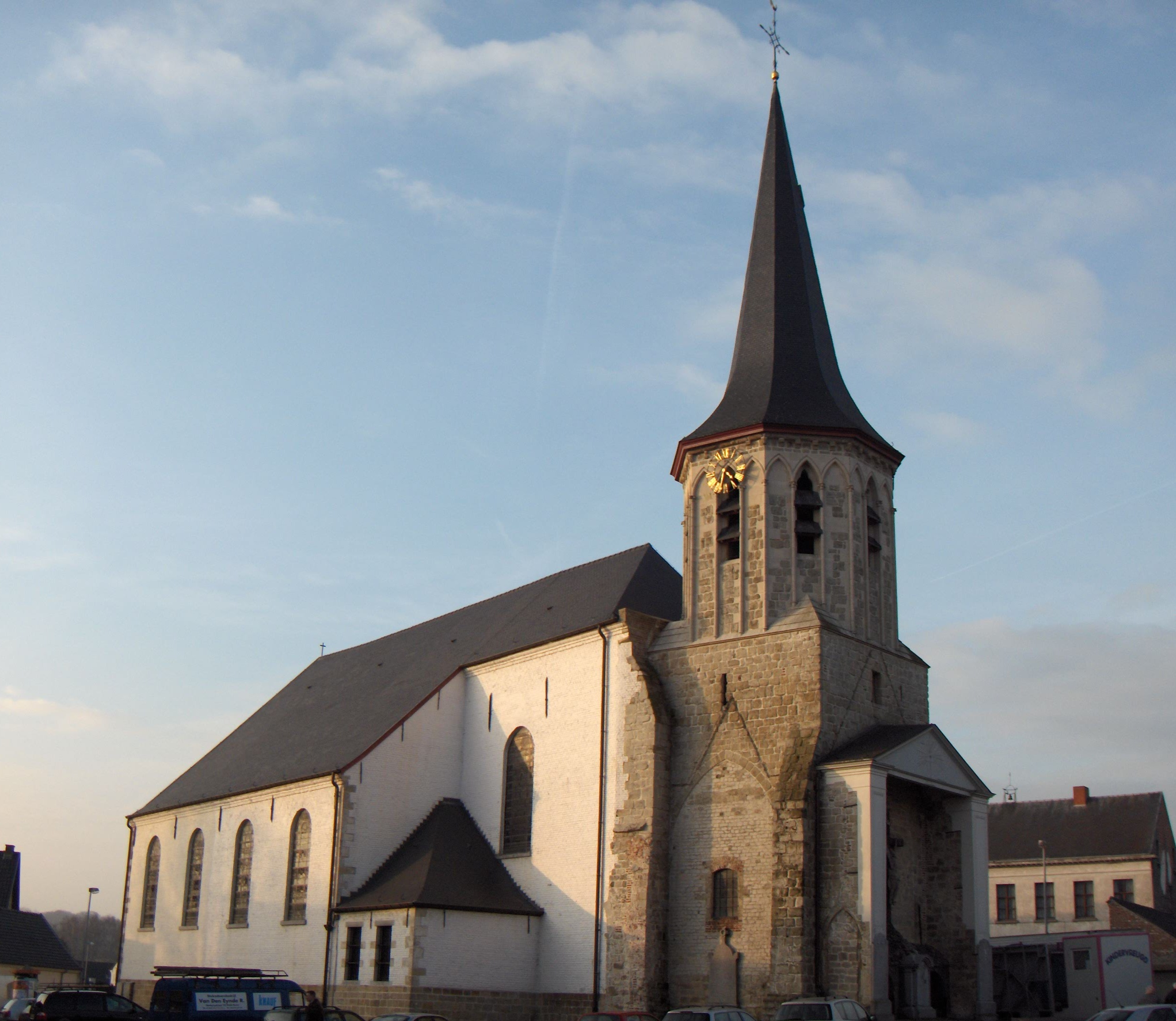
Saint-Nicolas Church

=== Church ===
Most of the Saint-Nicolas Church (in full: Saint-Nicolas- and Saint-Leonard Church) was built in 1786, and replaced a smaller Gothic church, of which only the tower of ca. 1300 remains, at the back of the current church building. This tower was the crossing tower of the old church. Traces of the roof, of the side aisles and of the choir are still visible on the tower. The 18th century construction is neoclassical, and built according to the plans of architect F. Drieghe, who was also responsible for the construction of the Saint-Christopher Church in Evergem.

== Sport ==
The football club SK Aaigem plays in Aaigem, and is active in the third provincial league of the province of East Flanders.

== Demographic development ==
Historical population

Year	Pop.	±%
1806	1,471	—
1816	1,538	+4.6%
1830	1,857	+20.7%
1846	1,738	−6.4%
1856	1,665	−4.2%
1866	1,653	−0.7%
1876	1,739	+5.2%

Year	Pop.	±%
1880	1,772	+1.9%
1890	1,813	+2.3%
1900	1,904	+5.0%
1910	2,003	+5.2%
1920	2,011	+0.4%
1930	1,905	−5.3%
1947	1,811	−4.9%

Year	Pop.	±%
1961	1,838	+1.5%
1970	1,862	+1.3%
1976	1,866	+0.2%
1990	?	—
2001	2,120	—
2006	2,098	−1.0%

Source: Belgian National Institute for Statistics (NIS) and the municipality of Erpe-Mere - Remark:1806 till 1970= census on 31 December; 1976= number of inhabitants on 31 December; 2001 and 2006=number of inhabitants on 1 January

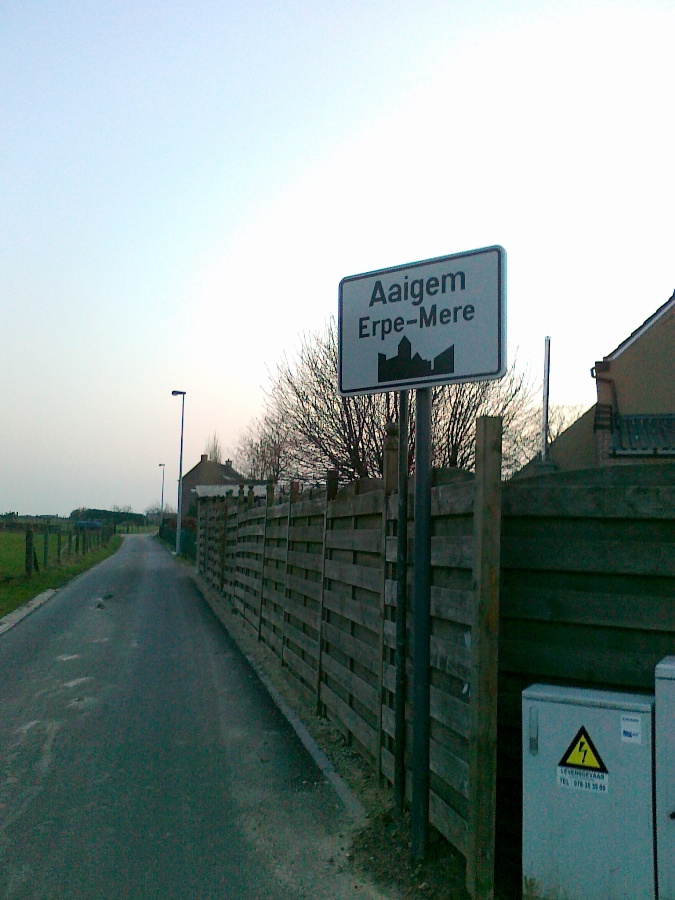
Town sign: the speed limit of 50 km/h in Aaigem

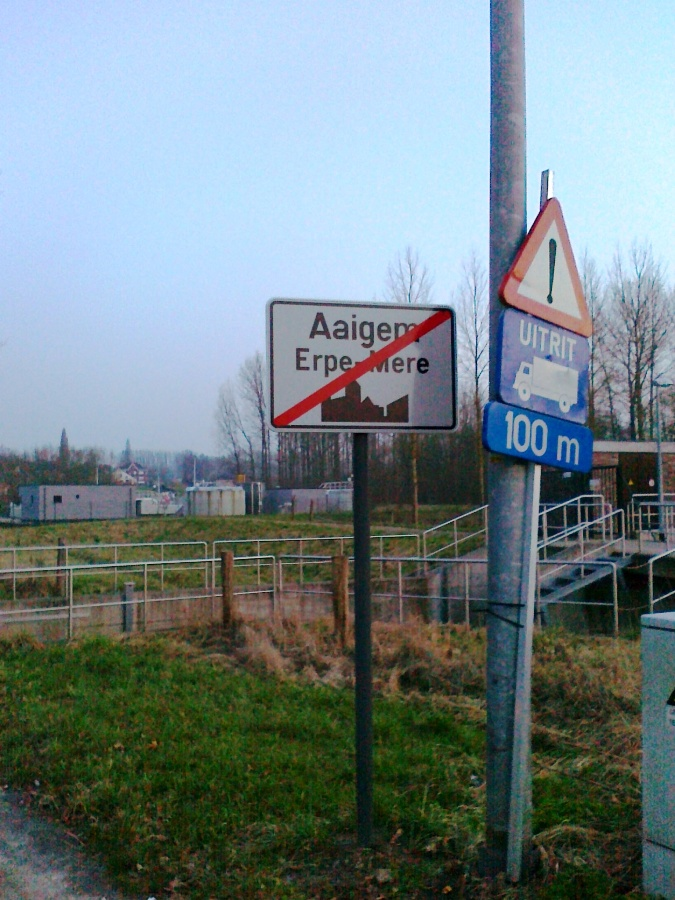
Town sign: no speed limit of 50 km/h any more in Aaigem
