= Papegem =

- Village
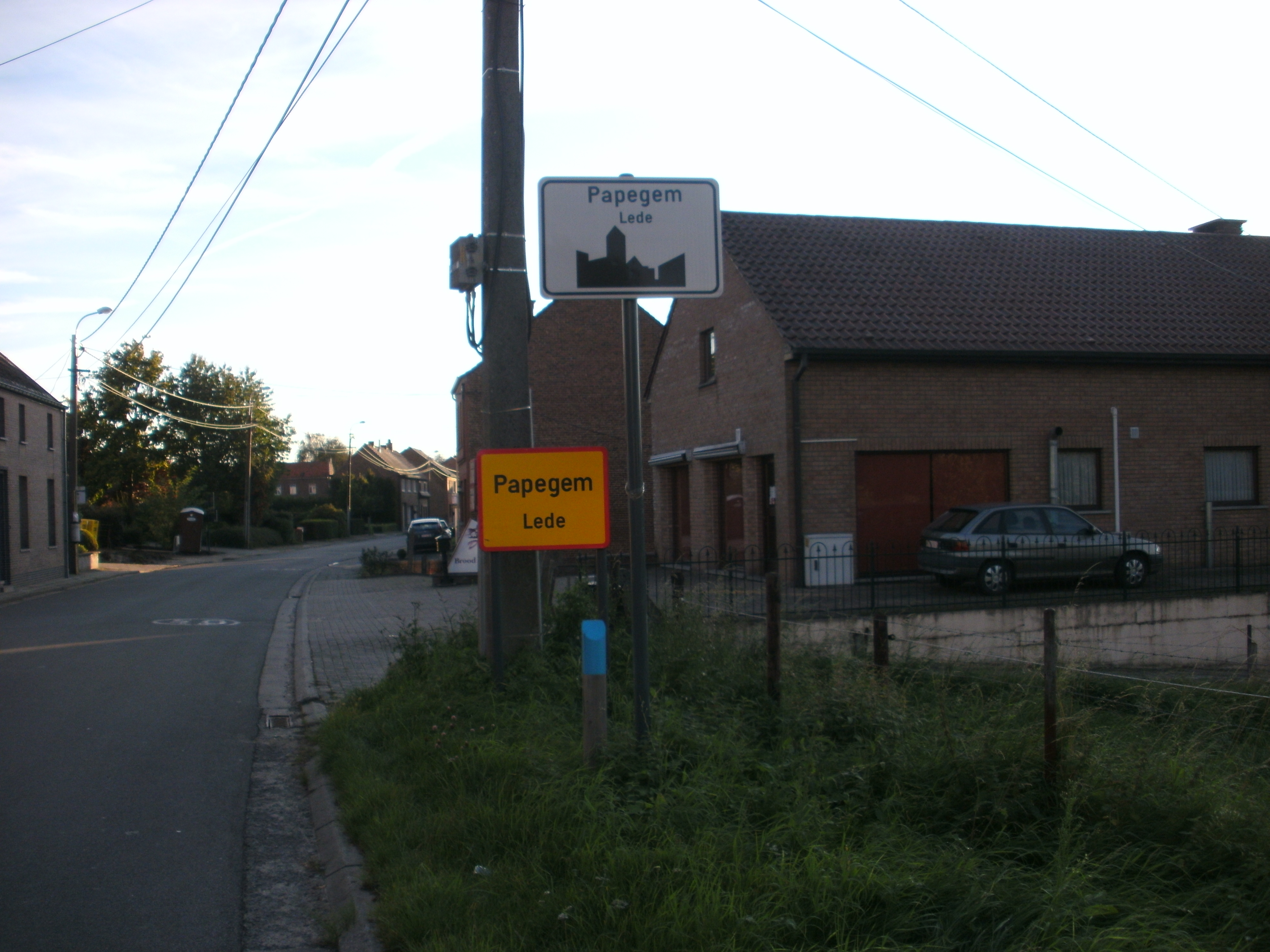
- View on Papegem at Papegemstraat

- Location within Belgium
- Coordinates: 50°57′14″N 3°55′52″E
- Country: Belgium
- Region: Flanders
- Province: East Flanders
- Arrondissement: Aalst
- Municipality: Lede

Area
  - Total: 0.61 km^{2} (0.24 sq mi)

Population (2021)
  - Total: 513
  - Density: 840/km^{2} (2,200/sq mi)
- Postal code: 9340
- Area code: 053

Papegem is a village in the municipality of Lede located in the Belgian province of East Flanders in the Denderstreek. It has an area of 0.58 km². The Wellebeek (a brook) which flows there belongs to the basin of the Molenbeek which originates from the Upper Scheldt, and flows through Erpe-Mere. In the past the Wellebeek was called the Papegemsche beek. It is bordered by the sub-municipalities of Oordegem, Smetlede and Impe, as well as the municipalities of Sint-Lievens-Houtem (sub-municipality Vlierzele) and Erpe-Mere (sub-municipality Erondegem, despite the small size of Papegem. In Papegem the Sint-Macharius Chapel can be found. Papegem belongs to the deanery of Herzele-Houtem.

== History ==
The Sint-Macharius Chapel was founded in 1890 on account of a typhus epidemic. It was inaugurated on 10 May 1891. In 1958/1959 there was a temporary church built which was received by the inauguration of Macharius as a patron saint. Before the merger of the municipalities in 1977, Papegem was a residential area of Vlierzele and had no street names. However, Papegem is now a village with about 400 inhabitants. Every year on the first weekend after the 8 May, there is a 9 day procession in honor of the Holy Macharius with a fair.

== Landmarks ==
- Sint-Machariuschurch
- Sint-Machariuschappel at Papegemstraat
- Onze Lieve Vrouwchappel at Putbosstraat
- Hof te Papegem, abbeyfarm, Papegemstraat 95
- View on Papegem at Papegemstraat, which has border signs of a sub-municipality

== Gallery ==
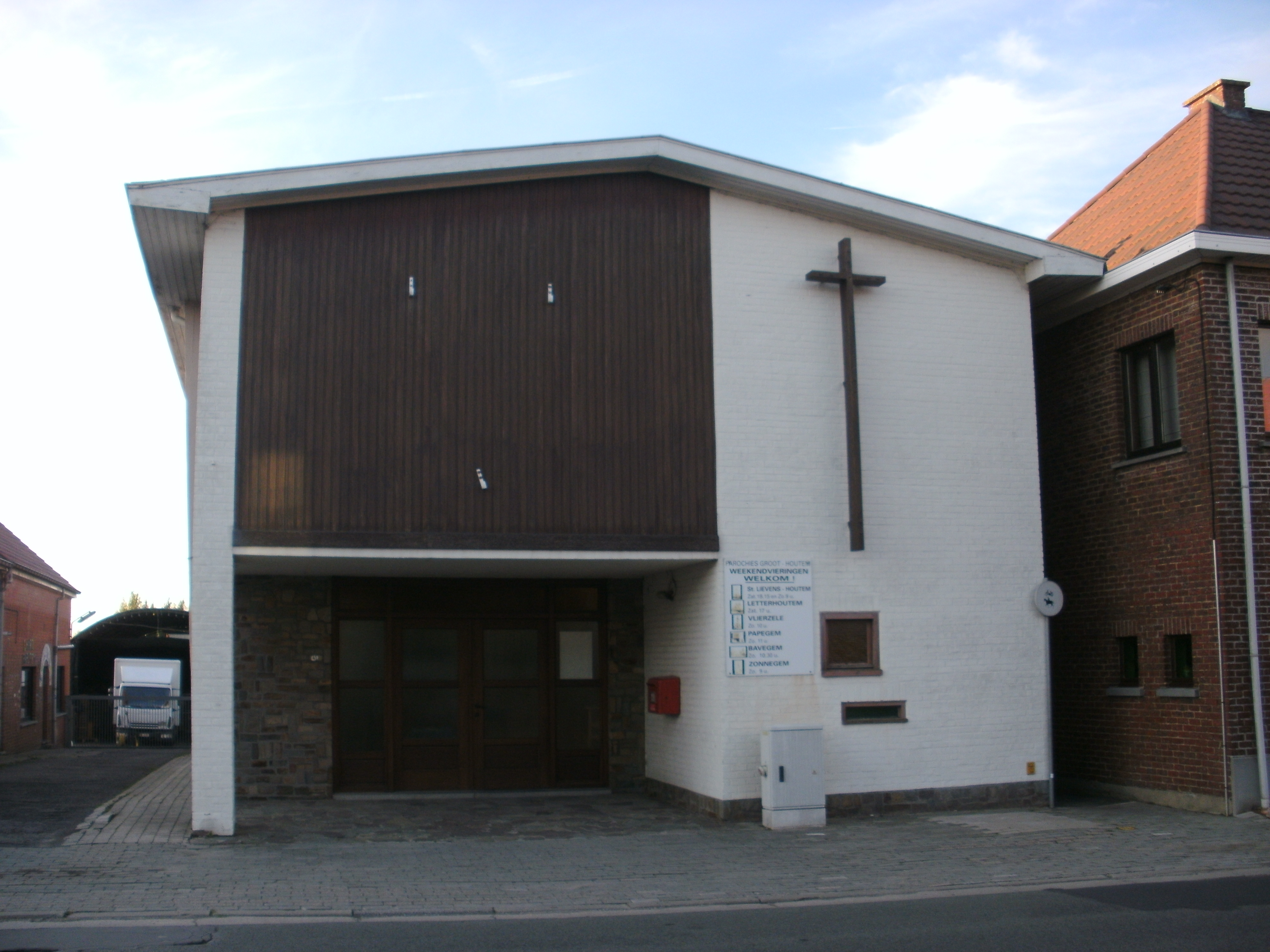
The church of Papegem

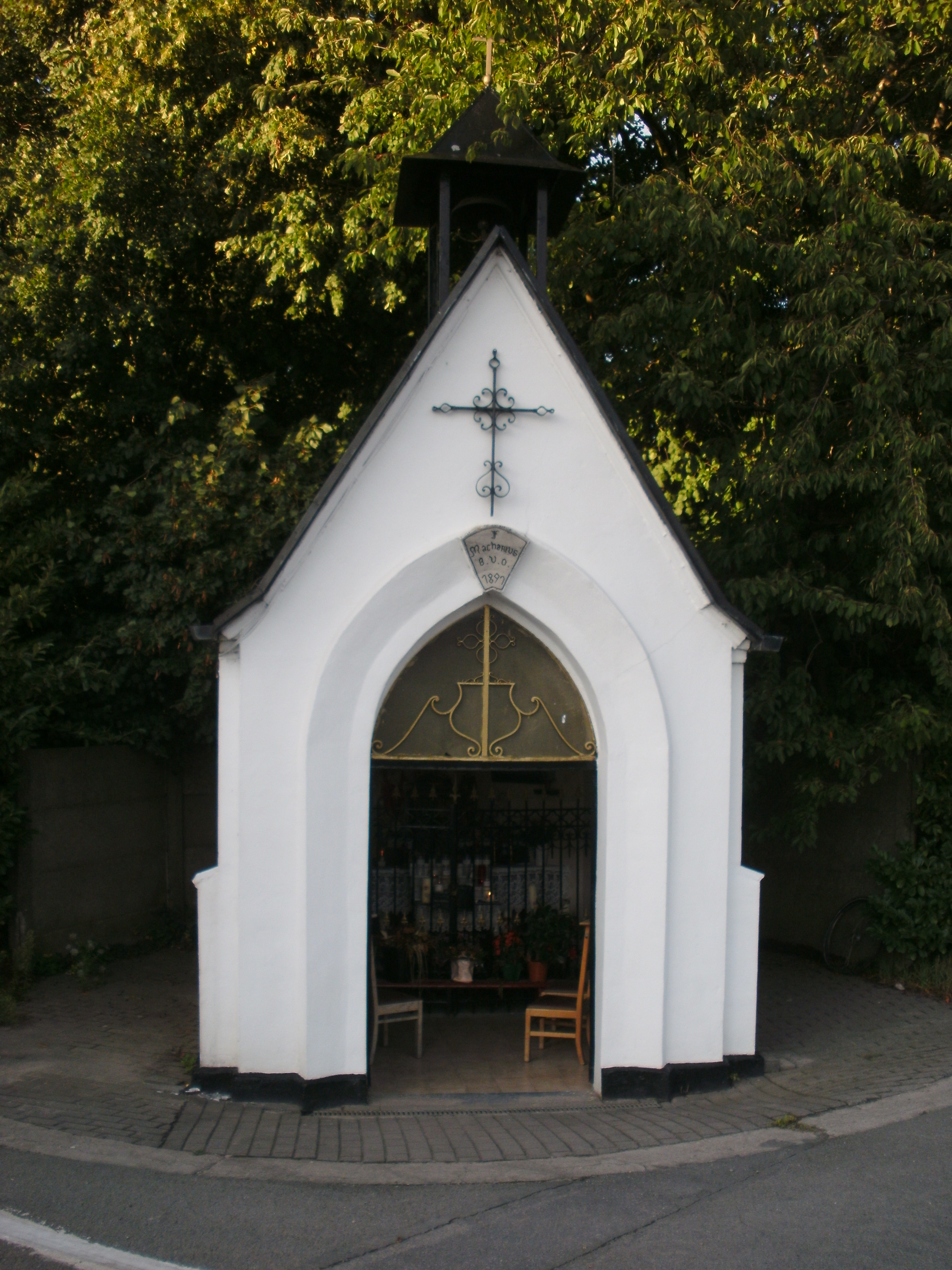
The little chapel at Papegemstraat

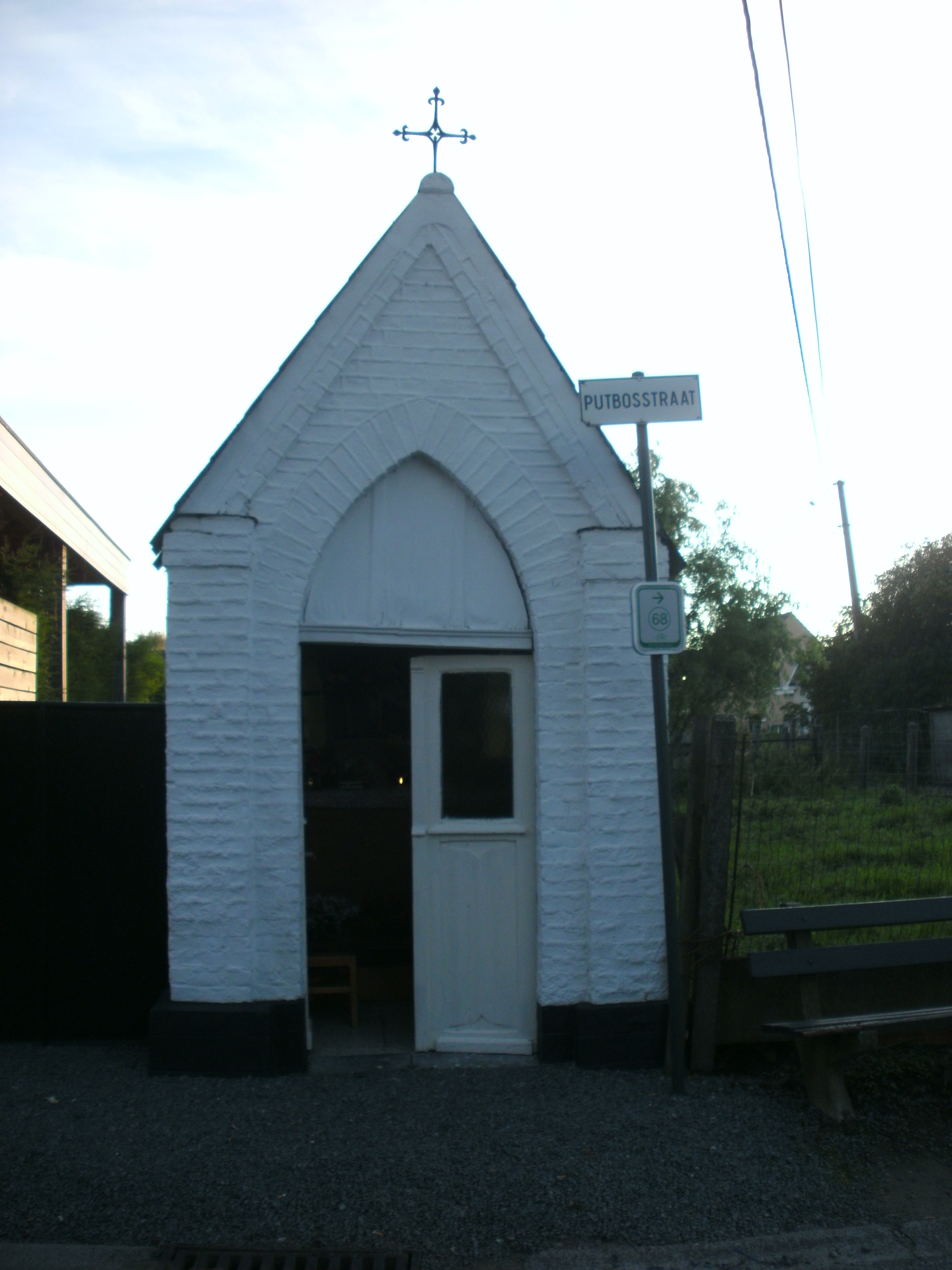
The little chapel at Putbosstraat

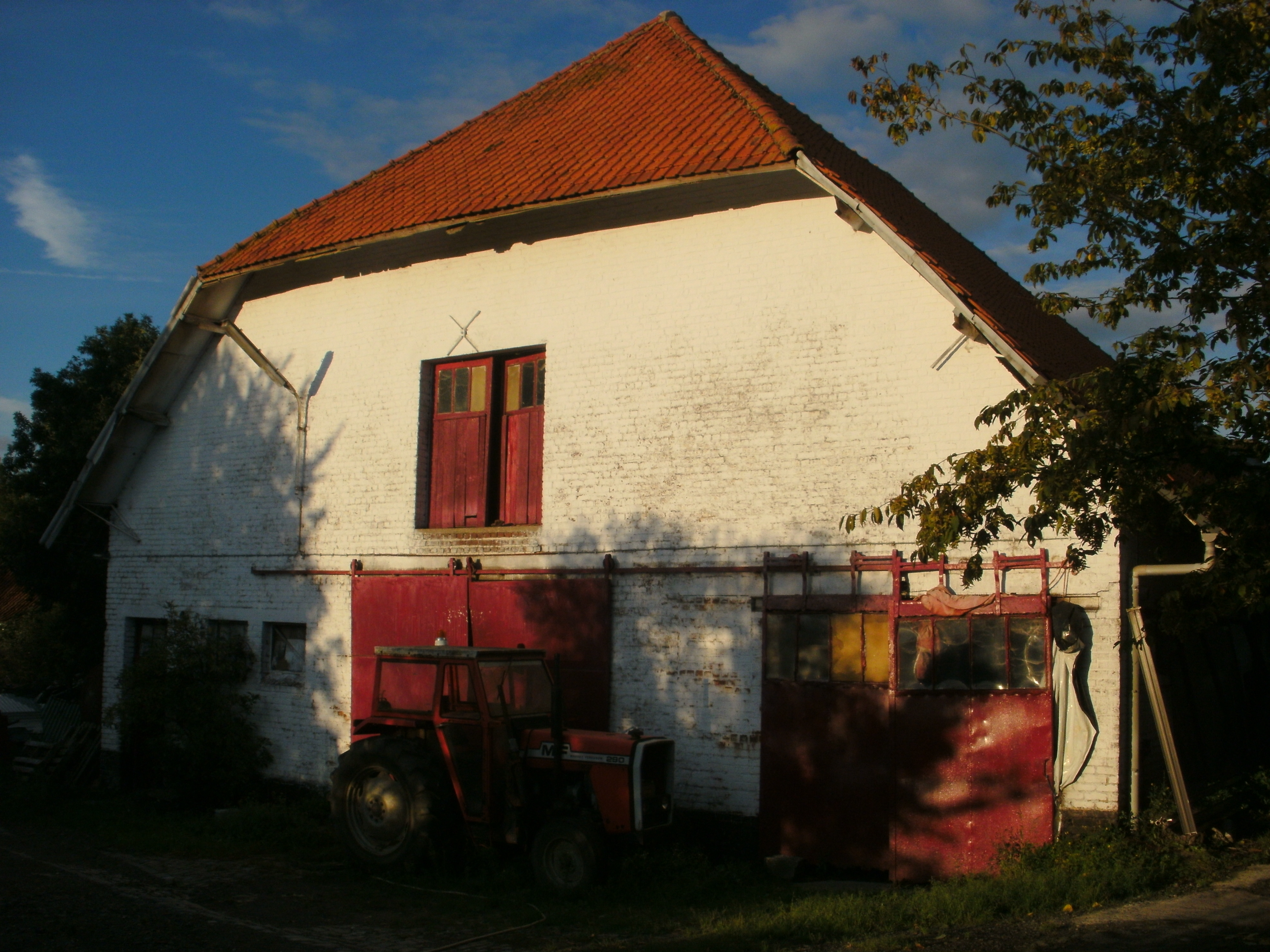
A farm at Papegemstraat
