= Den Briel =

Den Briel may refer to:

- Briel (parish), a parish in the municipality of Buggenhout and the sub-municipality of Baasrode in the town Dendermonde in Flanders
- Brielle, a town in the Netherlands
