= Malheur =

Malheur may refer to:

- Malheur County, Oregon
- Malheur Lake
- Malheur River
- Malheur Butte
- Malheur National Wildlife Refuge
- Occupation of the Malheur National Wildlife Refuge
- Malheur Reservation
- Malheur National Forest
- Malheur Bell
- Malheur Brewery
