= Gijzegem =

Village in Belgium

Coat of Arms of Gijzegem

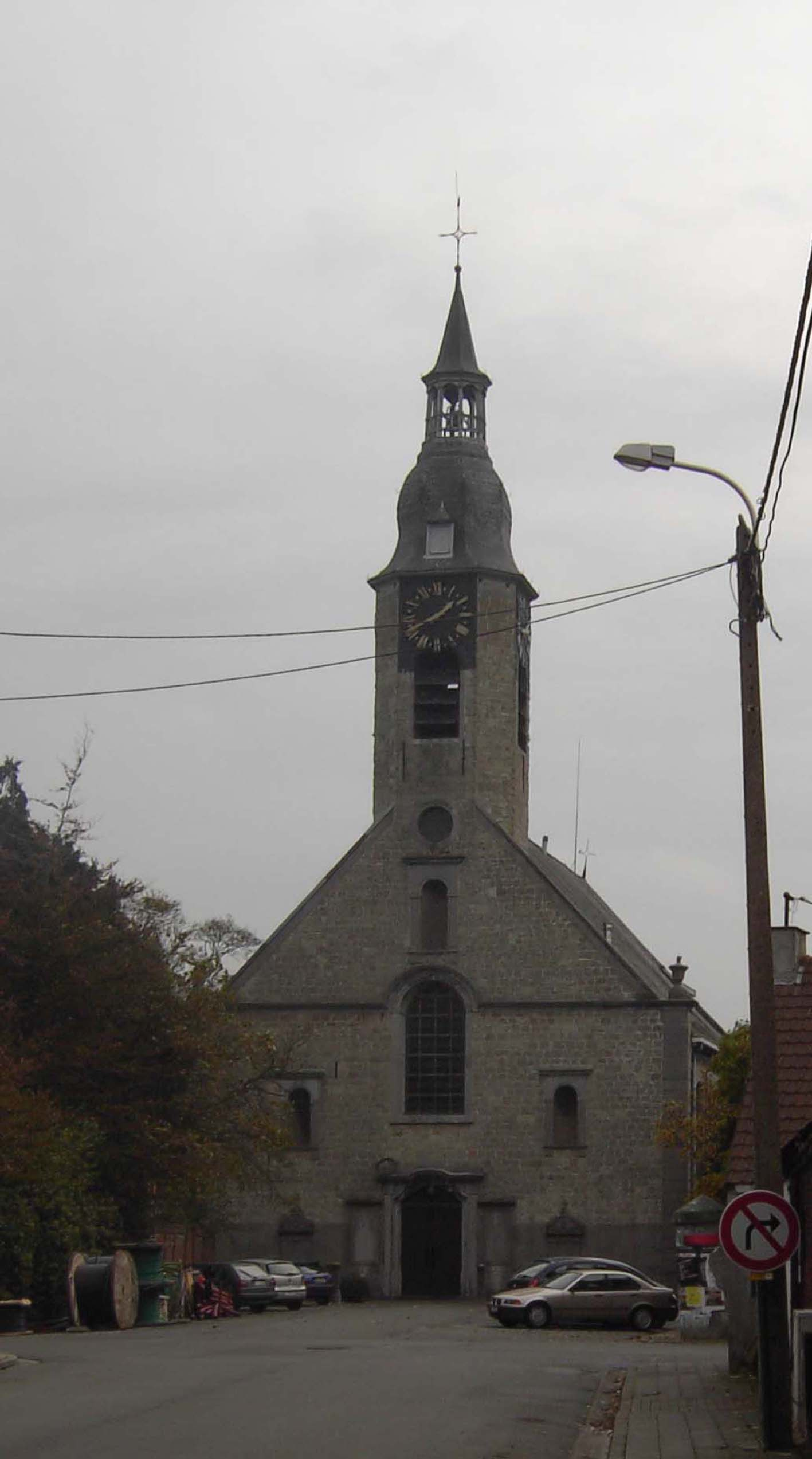
Church of Gijzegem

Gijzegem is a village in the Belgian province of East Flanders and is a submunicipality of Aalst. It was an independent municipality until the municipal reorganization of 1977. Gijzegem is located in the Denderstreek, north of the city centre of Aalst, along the road to Dendermonde. The village has 2581 inhabitants.

Until 1644 Gijzegem was a municipality was a lordship where the lords themselves were allowed to administer justice. The lordship became in 1399 in the possession of Robert van Leeuwergem, 1421 in the possession of the Godevaerts family, and in the late 15th-century, partly in the possession of the Godevaerts family and the Boccaert family. Jan van Royen is the first to bear the title of lord of Gijzegem.

Gijzegem is a residential municipality for commuters. Around the village centre is a villa districts and it has a social district between the Driesstraat and the Kleine Driesstraat.
