= Vlierzele =

- Village
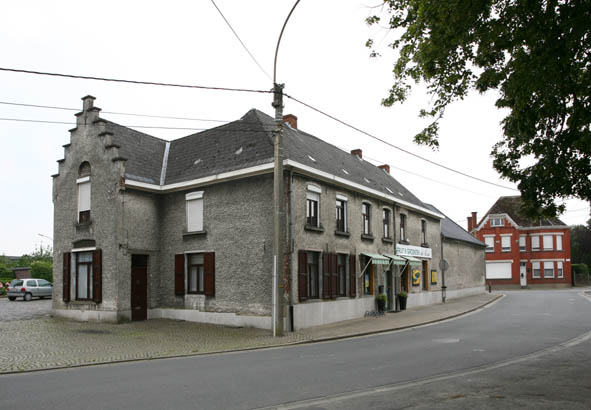
- Former town hall of Vlierzele

- Location in Belgium
- Coordinates: 50°56′N 3°54′E
- Country: Belgium
- Region: Flemish Region
- Province: East Flanders
- Municipality: Sint-Lievens-Houtem

Area
  - Total: 6.23 km^{2} (2.41 sq mi)

Population (2021)
  - Total: 2,169
  - Density: 348/km^{2} (902/sq mi)
- Time zone: CET

Vlierzele is a village on the Molenbeek, in the Denderstreek, at the edge of the Flemish Ardennes, the hilly southern part of East Flanders, Belgium. It belongs to the municipality of Sint-Lievens-Houtem.

Etymologically the name Vlierzele is derived from Fliteritsale (in 639) and Vliendersele (in 1412). This is a combination of either the plant name "vlier", which is Dutch for "elder", or the person's name Flether, and "sale" or "sele", which both mean place of residence in Old-Dutch.

The neighbouring villages are:

- Bambrugge
- Bavegem
- Borsbeke
- Burst
- Erondegem
- Letterhoutem
- Ottergem
- Oordegem
- Papegem
- Vlekkem
- Zonnegem

== Gallery ==
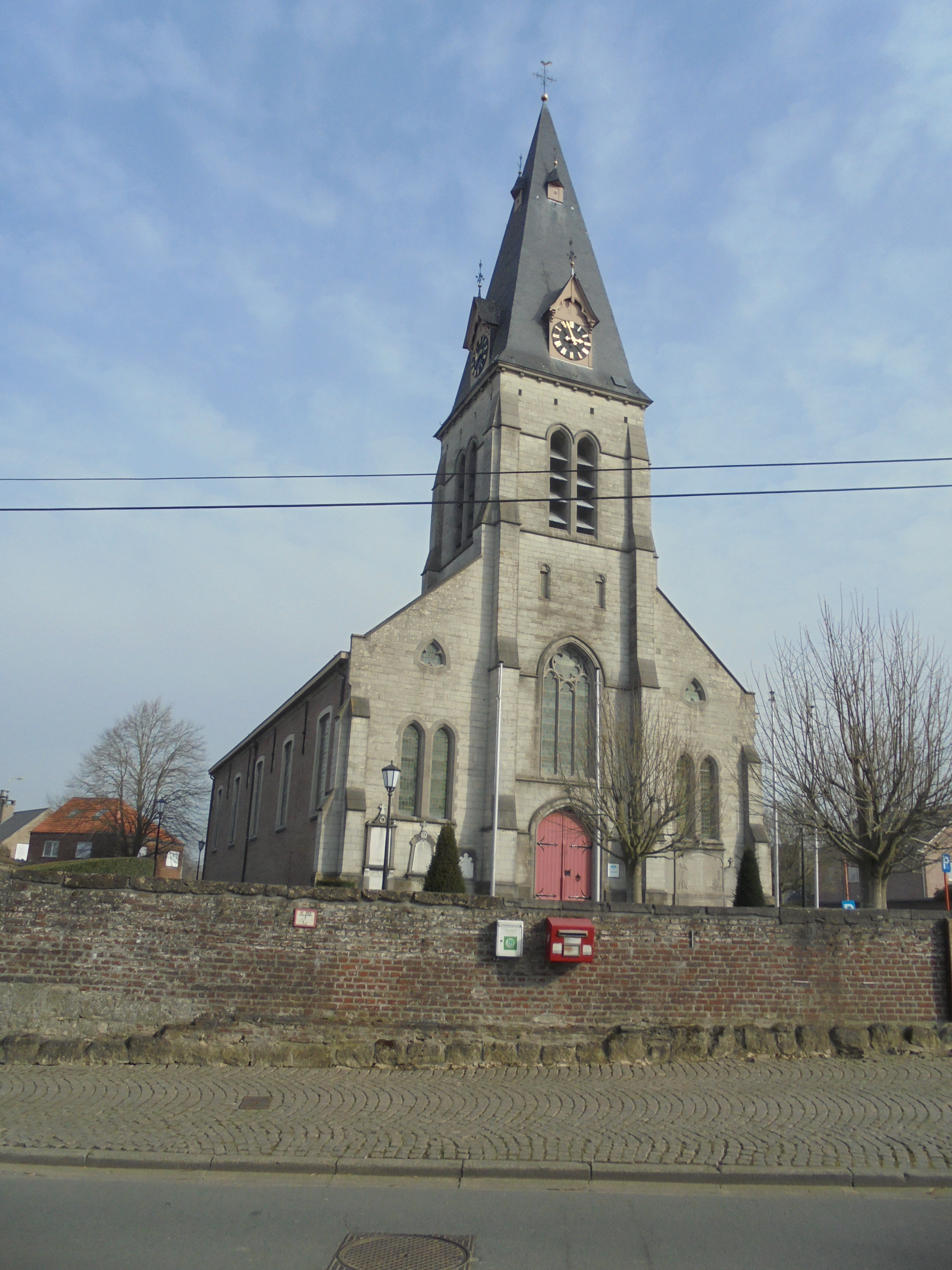
St Fledericus Church

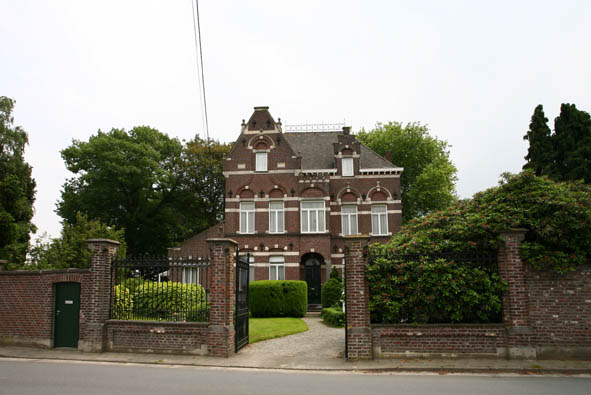
Villa in Vlierzele

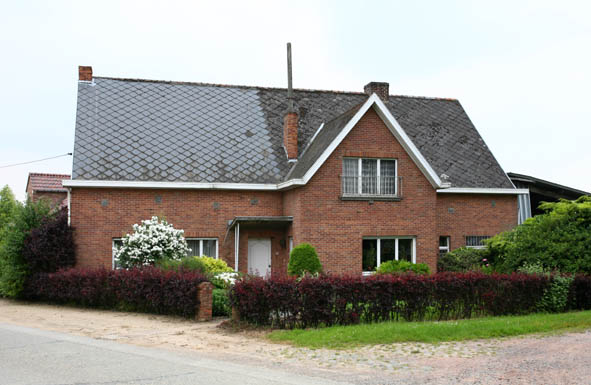
House in Vlierzele
