= Haaltert =

- Municipality
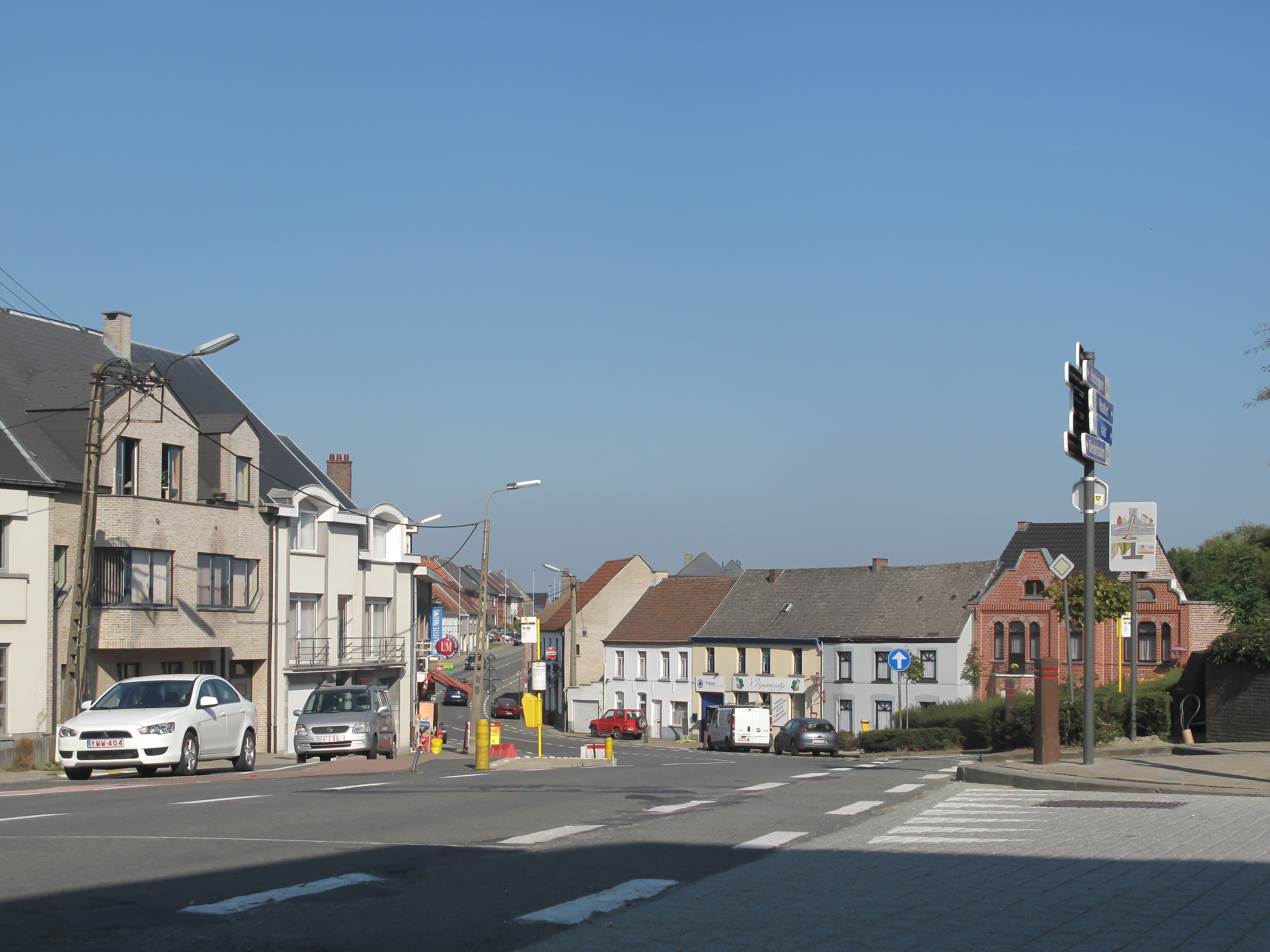
- Kerksken

- Flag Coat of arms

- Location of Haaltert in East Flanders
- Interactive map of Haaltert
- Location in Belgium
- Coordinates: 50°54′N 04°00′E
- Country: Belgium
- Community: Flemish Community
- Region: Flemish Region
- Province: East Flanders
- Arrondissement: Aalst

Government
  - Mayor: Veerle Baeyens (N-VA)
  - Governing parties: N-VA, CD&V, Vooruit

Area
  - Total: 30.52 km^{2} (11.78 sq mi)

Population (2018-01-01)
  - Total: 18,443
  - Density: 604.3/km^{2} (1,565/sq mi)
- Postal codes: 9450, 9451
- NIS code: 41024
- Area codes: 053
- Website: www.haaltert.be

A speaker of Oiltjers Dutch, the dialect of Dutch spoken in Haaltert.

Haaltert (Dutch pronunciation: [ˈɦaːltərt]) is a municipality located in the Belgian province of East Flanders in the Denderstreek. The municipality comprises the towns of Denderhoutem, Haaltert proper, Heldergem and Kerksken. In 2021, Haaltert had a total population of 18,892. The total area is 30.30 km^{2}. The current mayor of Haaltert is Veerle Baeyens, from the N-VA.

There is a 205 hectare nature reserve Den Dotter in the sub-municipalities of Aaigem (municipality Erpe-Mere) and Heldergem (municipality Haaltert). Haaltert is crossed by the Molenbeek-Ter Erpenbeek creek in Heldergem, Kerksken, and Haaltert.

== Gallery ==
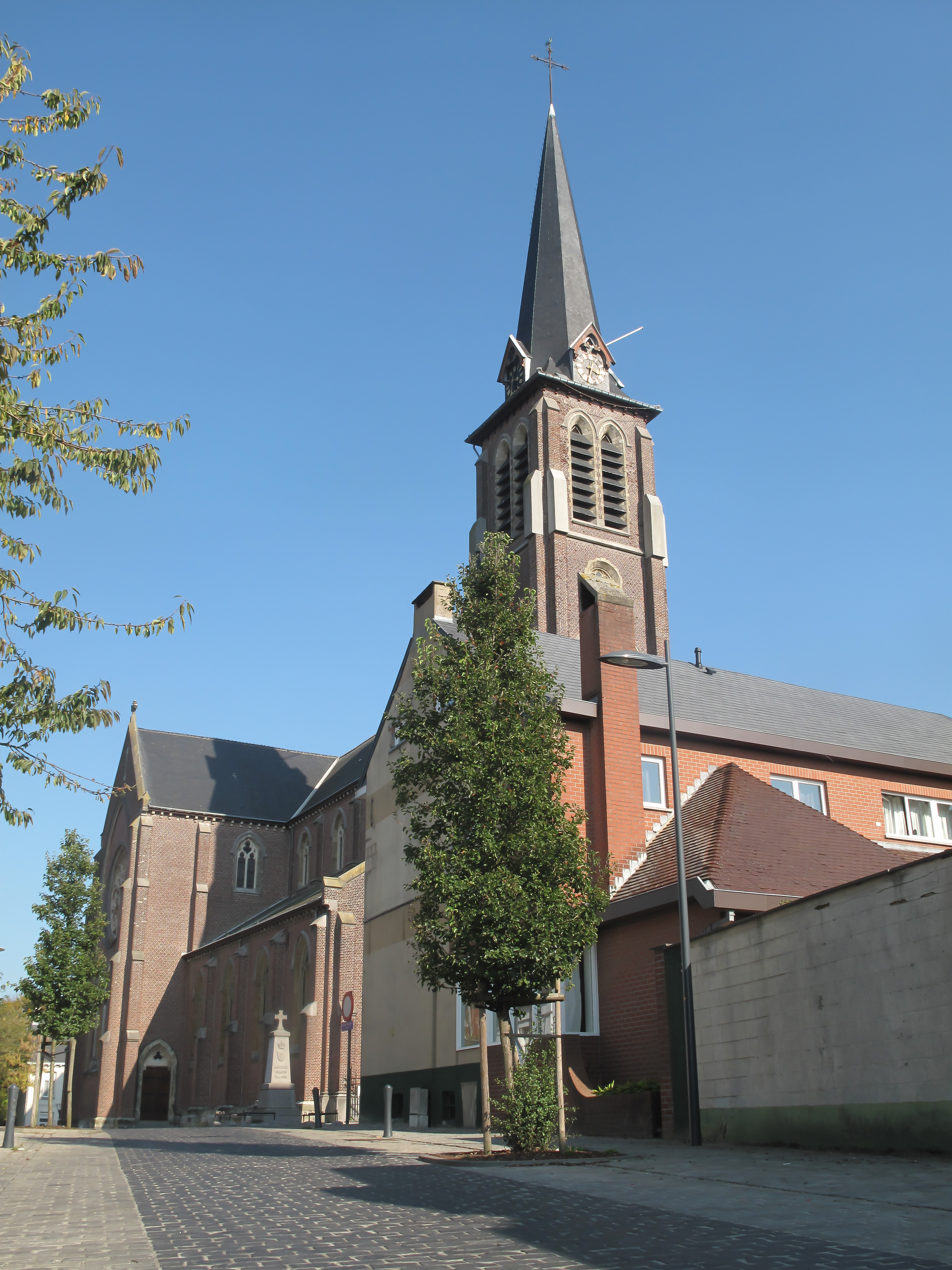
Saint Gorik church

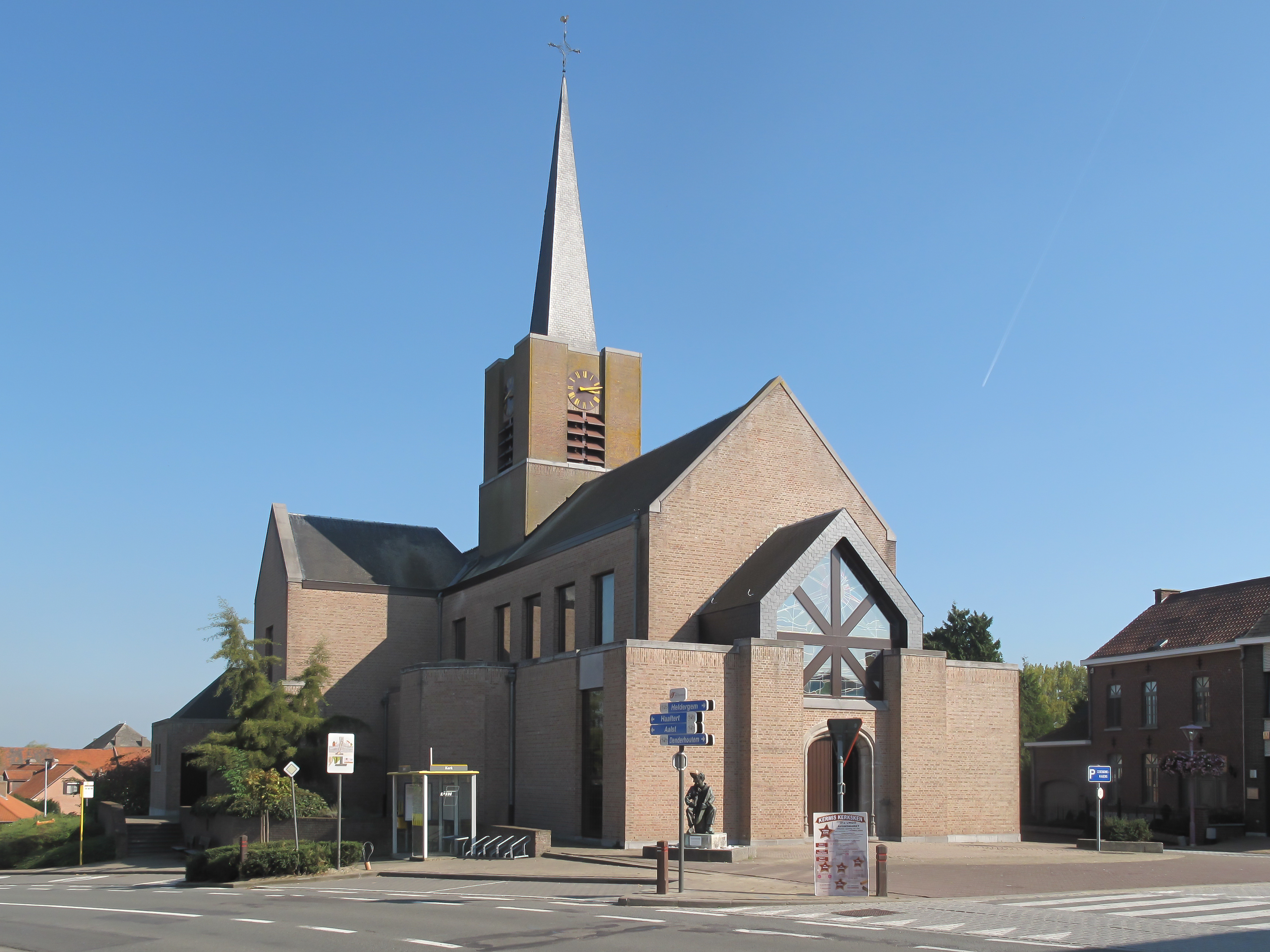
Kerksken, church

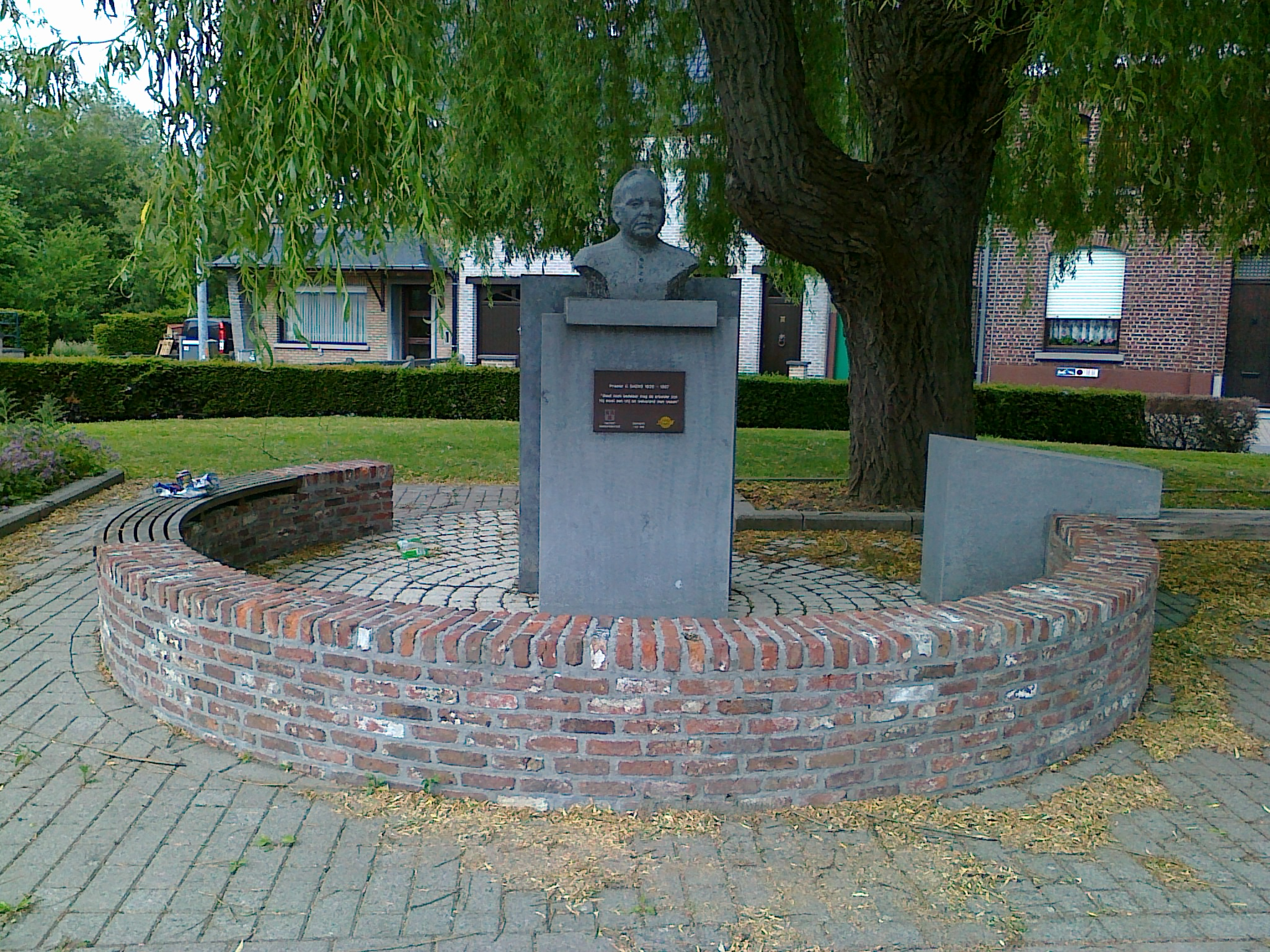
Statue of Priest Daens in Ede
