= Nieuwerkerken-Aalst =

Village in Belgium

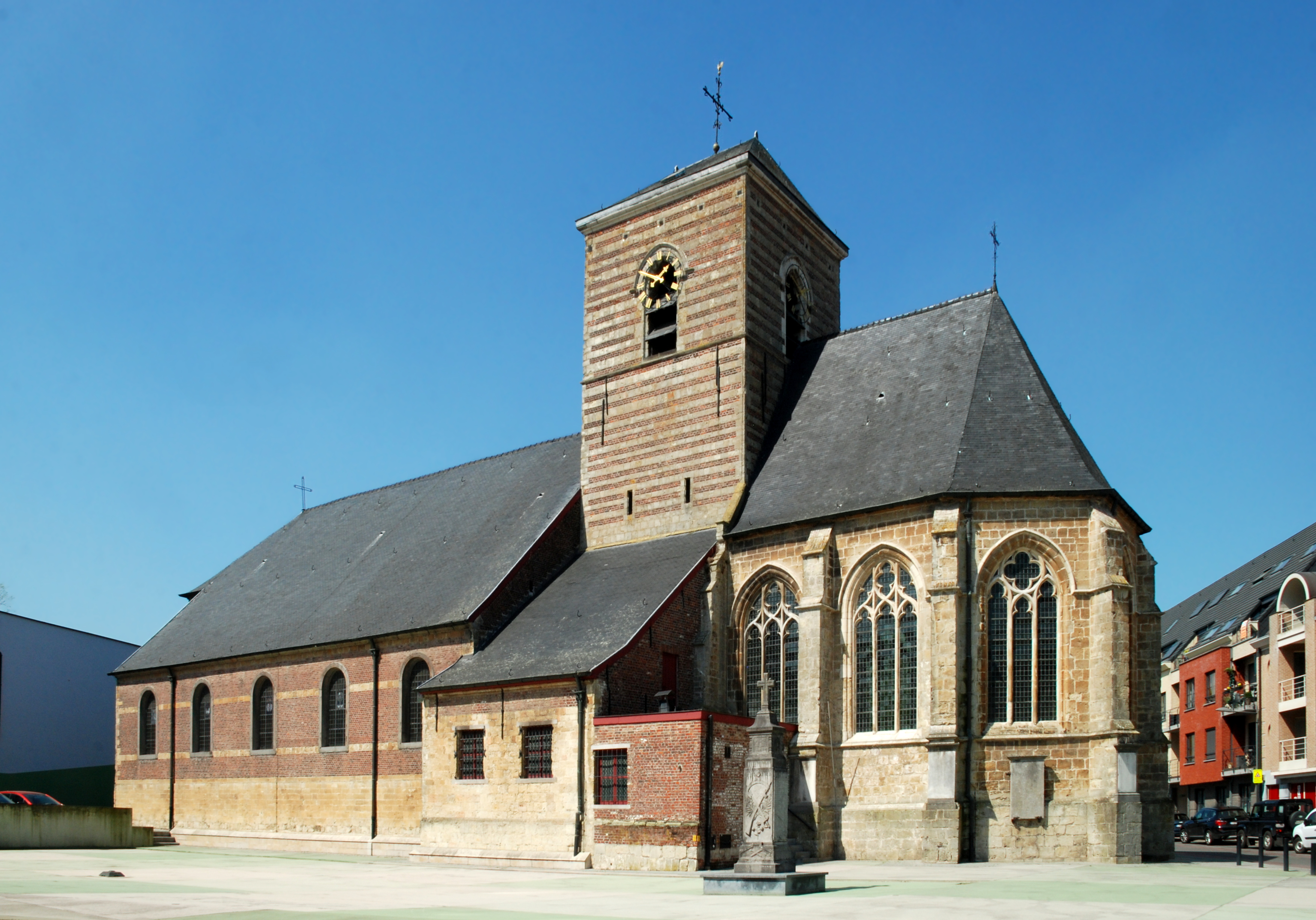
One of the churches of Nieuwerkerken

Nieuwerkerken is a village in the Belgian province of East Flanders and is a submunicipality of Aalst. It was an independent municipality until the municipal reorganization of 1977. Baardegem is located in the Denderstreek and has 6249 inhabitants.

Nieuwerkerken was mentioned in 1139 as Nova Ecclesia. During the Ancien Régime, the largest part of the municipality was dependent on the lordship Attenhoven, a fief of the Saint-Lambertus chapter in Liège.

Nieuwerkerken has its own dialect.
