= Buggenhout =

Municipality in East Flanders, Belgium

- Municipality
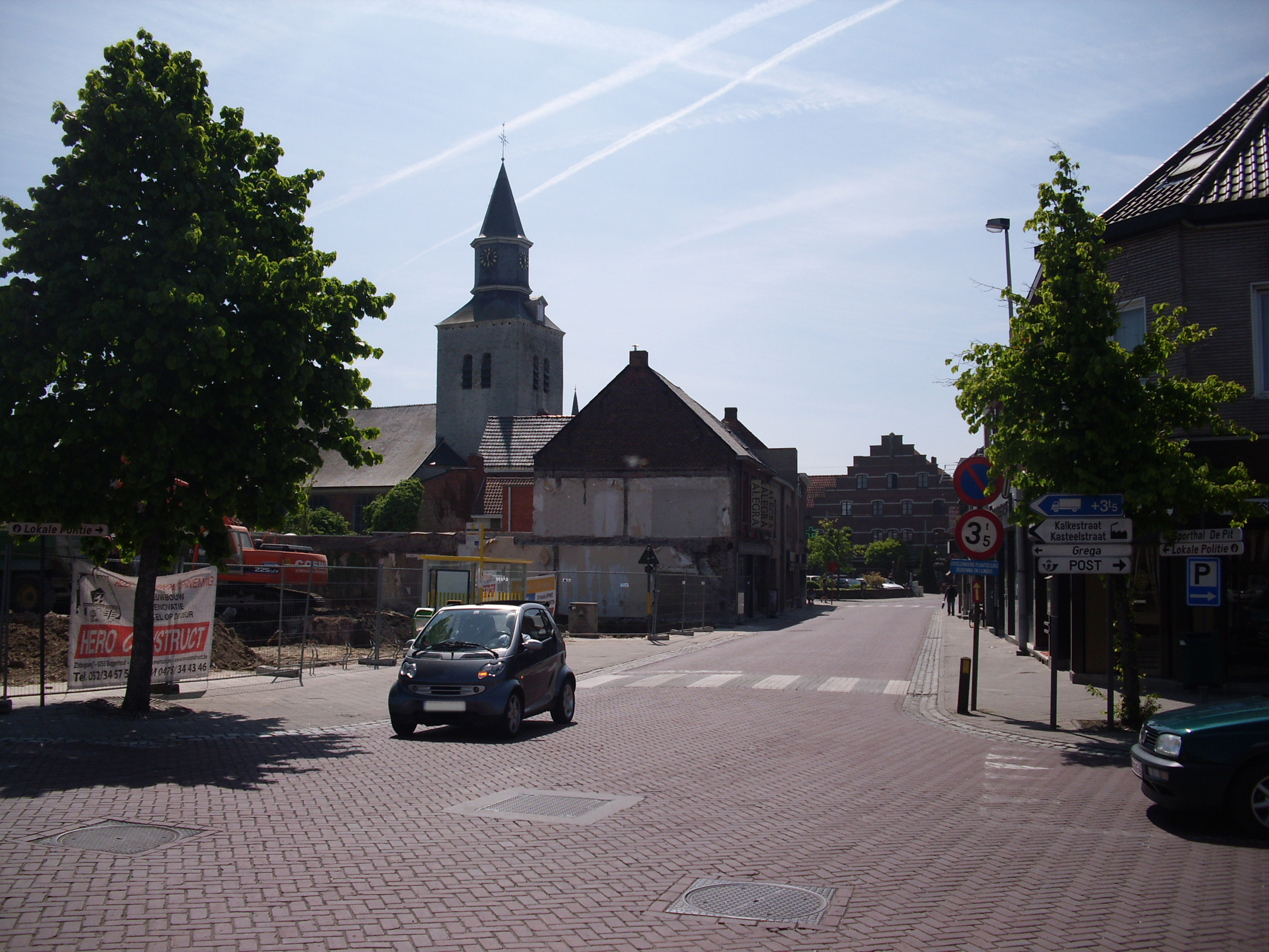
- Town centre in 2010

- Flag Coat of arms

- Location of Buggenhout in East Flanders
- Interactive map of Buggenhout
- Location in Belgium
- Coordinates: 51°00′N 04°12′E
- Country: Belgium
- Community: Flemish Community
- Region: Flemish Region
- Province: East Flanders
- Arrondissement: Dendermonde

Government
  - Mayor: Pierre Claeys (CD&V)
  - Governing party: CD&V

Area
  - Total: 25.64 km^{2} (9.90 sq mi)

Population (2018-01-01)
  - Total: 14,475
  - Density: 564.5/km^{2} (1,462/sq mi)
- Postal codes: 9255
- NIS code: 42004
- Area codes: 052
- Website: www.buggenhout.be

Buggenhout (Dutch pronunciation: [ˈbʏɣə(n)ɦʌut]) is a municipality in the Belgian province of East Flanders in the Denderstreek. The municipality comprises the towns of Buggenhout proper, Briel, Opdorp, and Opstal. In 2021, Buggenhout had a total population of 14,689. The total area is 25.25 square kilometres.

Buggenhout is also known for its forest, the "Buggenhoutbos", which is the largest forest of East Flanders.

The municipality is 20 km north-west of Brussels city centre. The geographic centre of Flanders lies in Opdorp.

Buggenhout has two breweries, Bosteels Brewery (known for the "Tripel Karmeliet", "Deus" (a champagne beer), "Kwak") and De Landtsheer, now called Brouwerij Malheur (known for "Malheur").

== Etymology ==
The original meaning of the name is "beechwood" or "beech forest" (in modern Dutch: Beukenhout). The name is derived from the Middle Dutch Bucghenhout from Old Dutch Bukenholt. Buken comes from Proto-Germanic *bokjon (Modern Dutch: beuken, Old English: becen (beeches)), holt from *hulta (Modern Dutch: hout (bos), Old English: holt (forest)). Buggenhout still contains a forested area called Buggenhoutbos.

== History ==
The village was first mention in 1125. It used to belong to the Duchy of Brabant. Due to internal feuds, the area was confiscated. The forest was declared crown land, and the village of Buggenhout became two heerlijkheden (landed estates). After the French Revolution, Buggenhout was transferred to East Flanders.

== Gallery ==
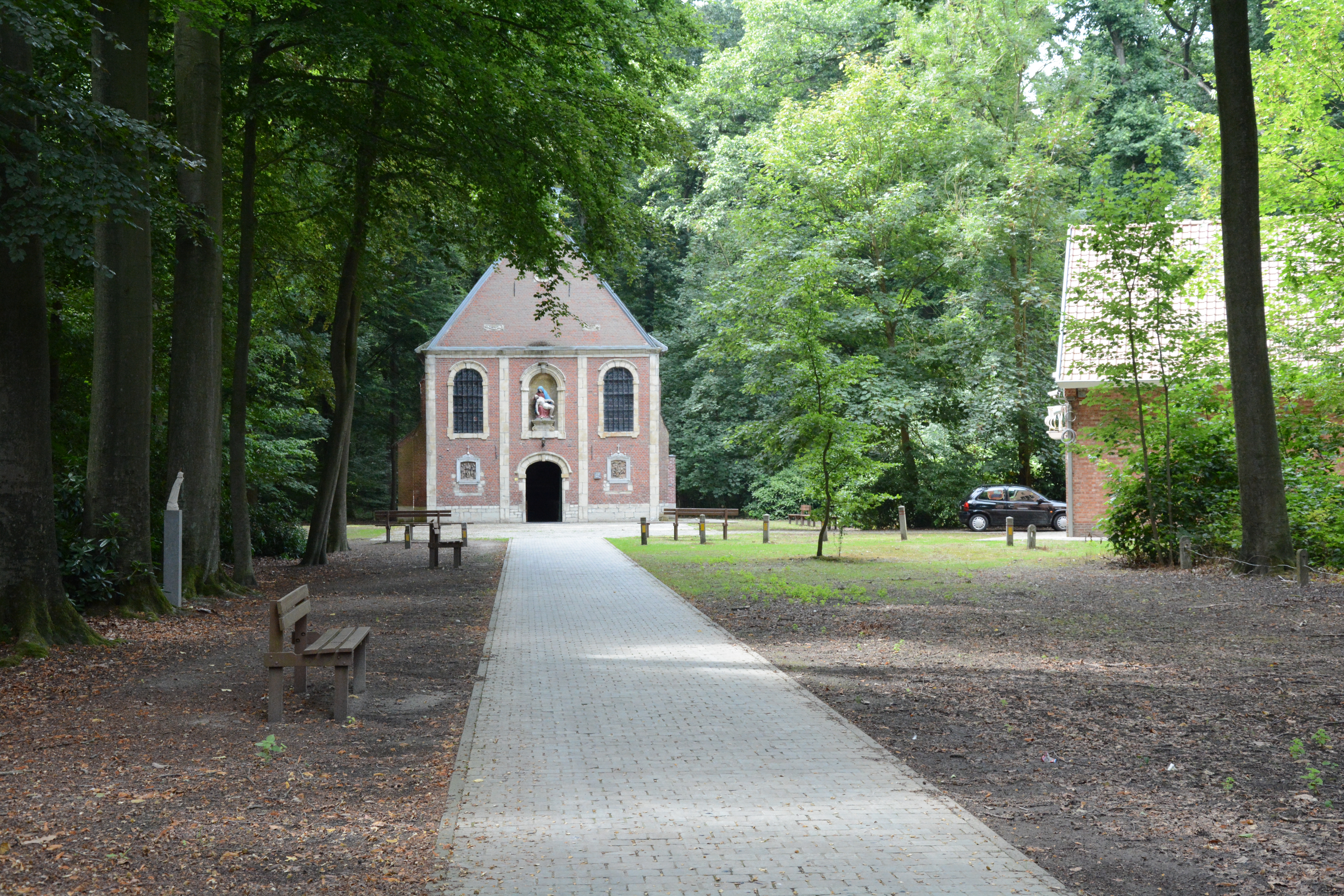
Forest chapel

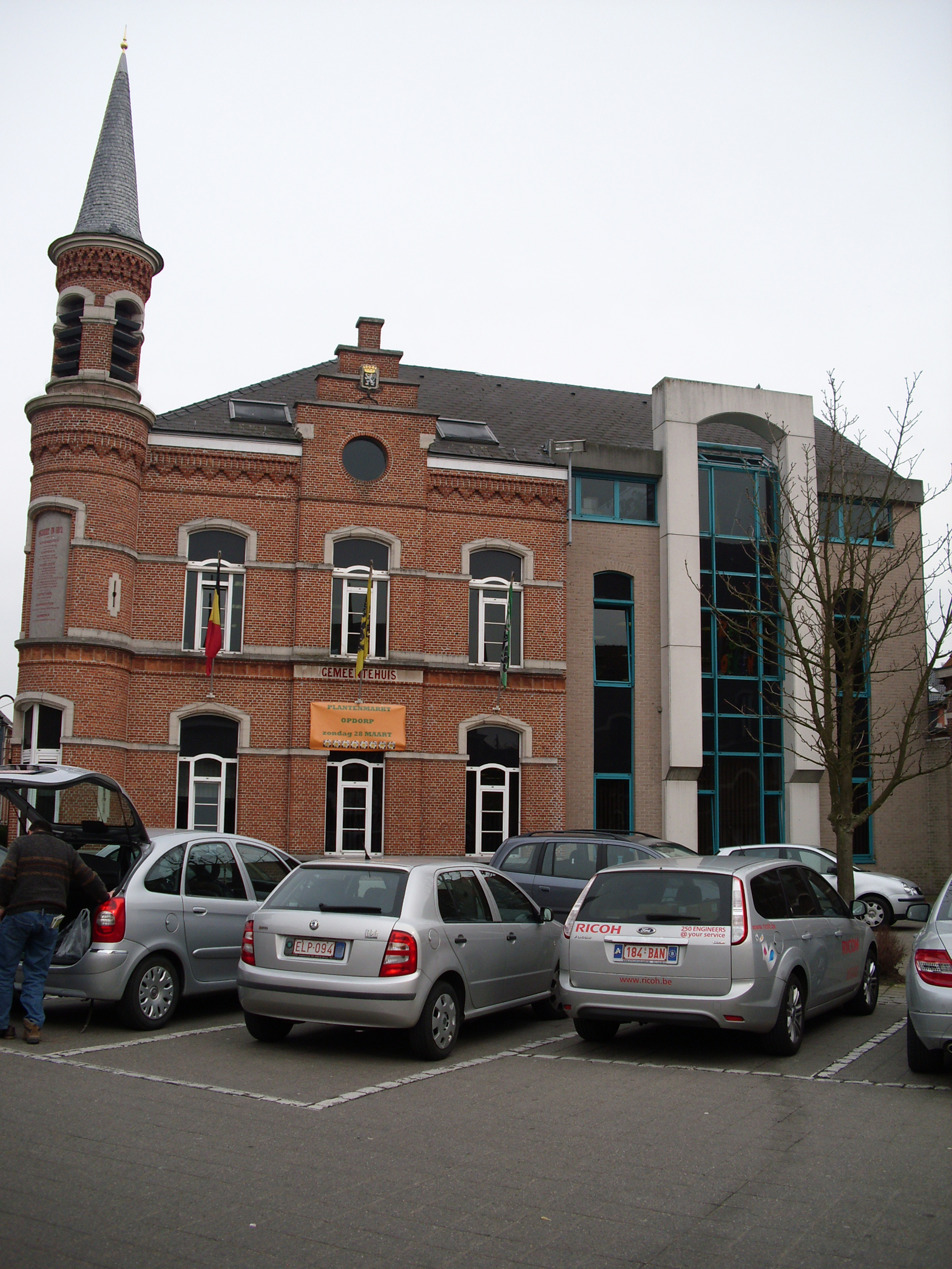
Town hall

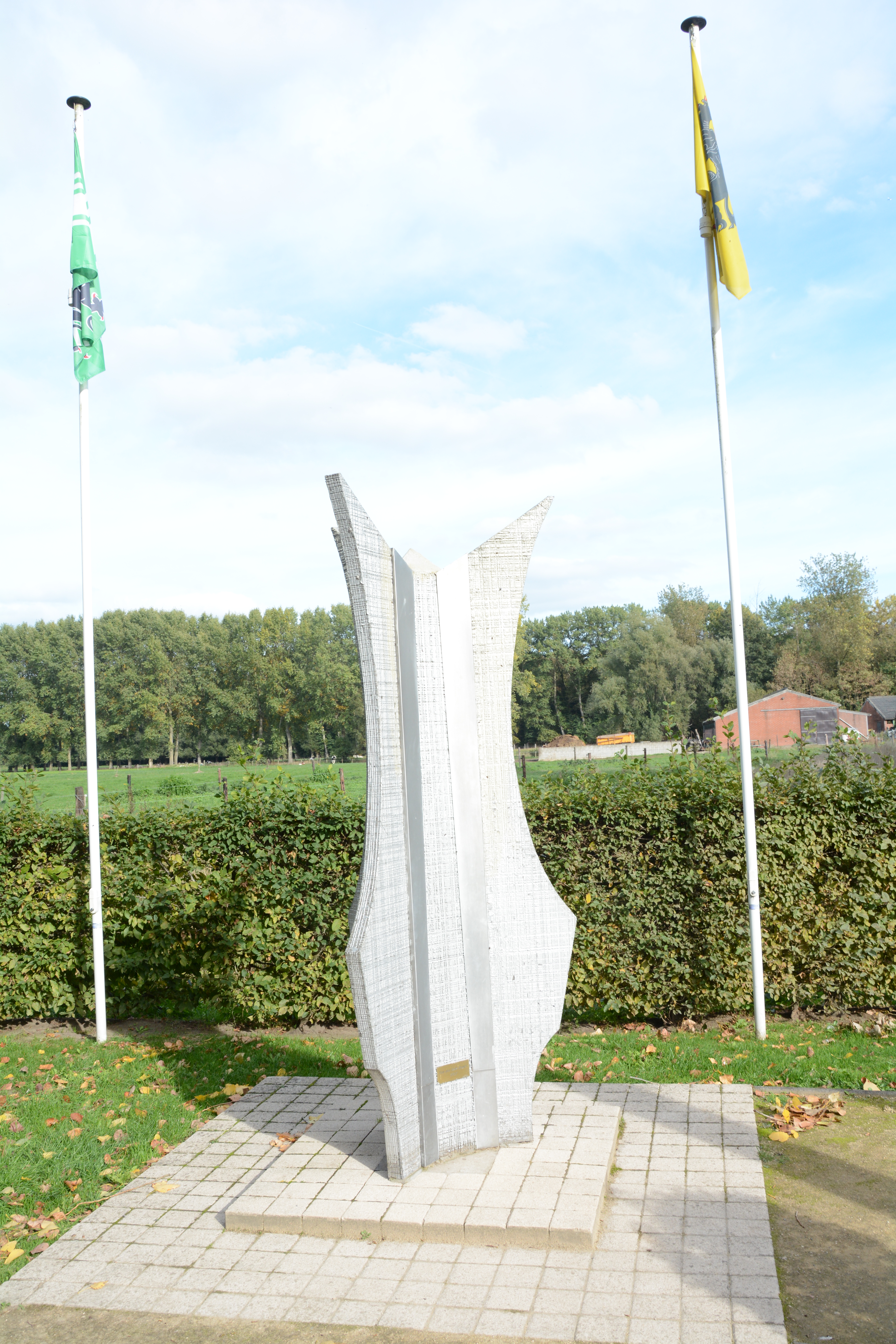
Geographical centre of Flanders

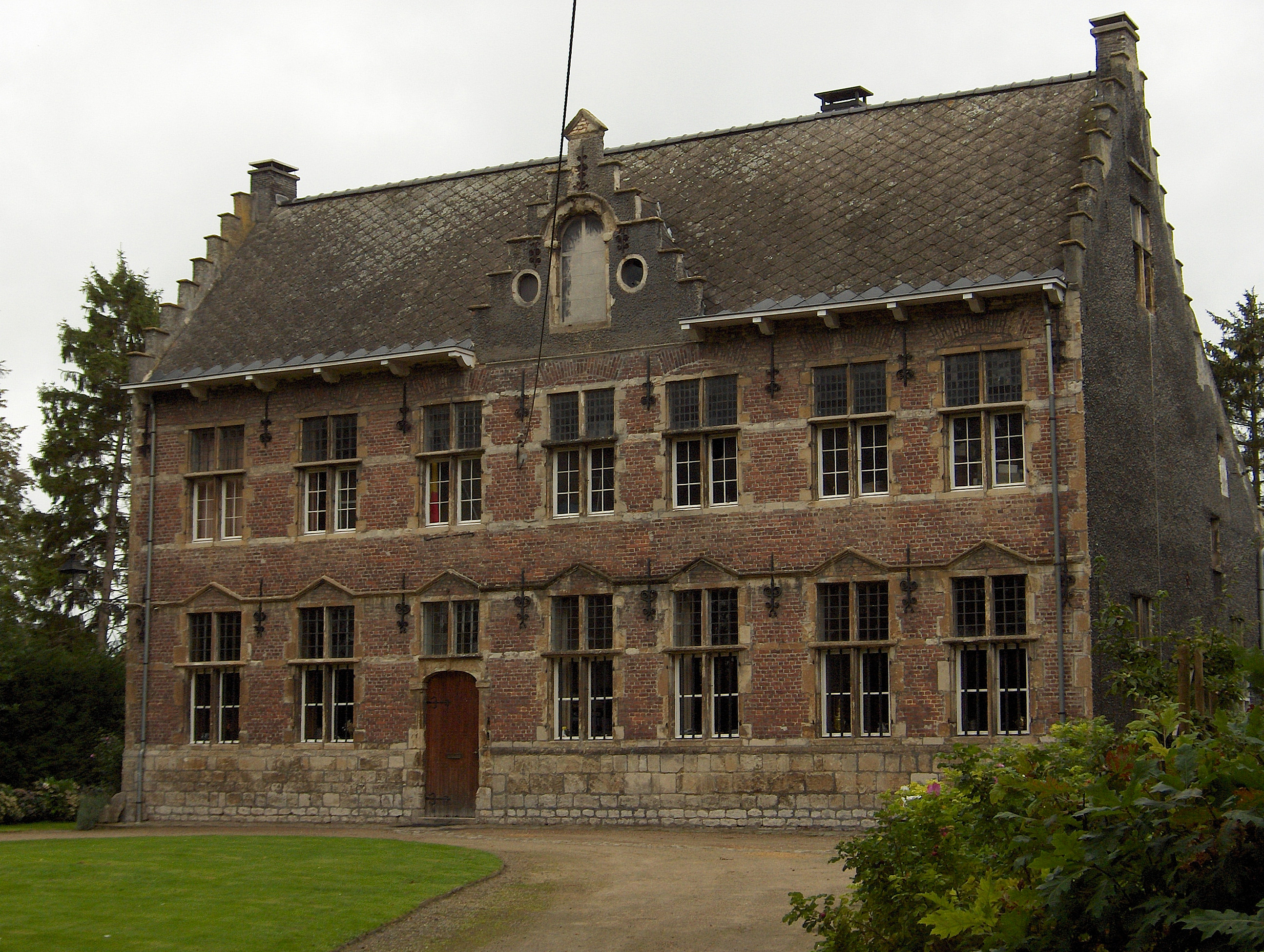
Cruysveltstede
