= Bosteels Brewery =

Belgian brewery

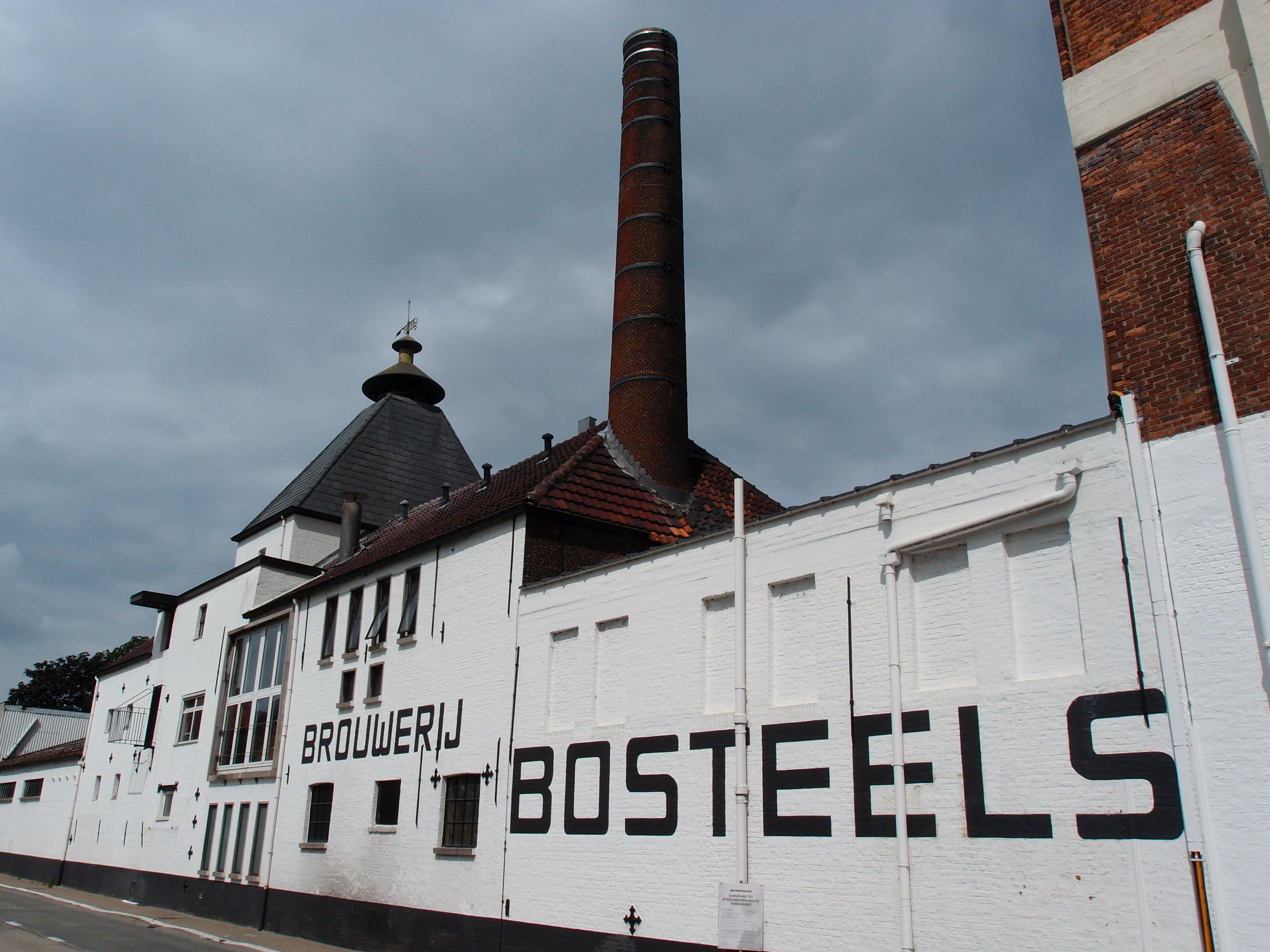
- Bosteels Brewery
- Interactive map of Bosteels Brewery
- Location: Buggenhout, Belgium
- Opened: 1791

Bosteels Brewery (Brouwerij Bosteels) is a brewery in Buggenhout, Belgium. The brewery was founded in 1791 and was owned and operated by the same family. Bosteels brew three beers: Tripel Karmeliet, DeuS, and Pauwel Kwak. In 2019 a new beer was added for the first time in 17 years: Monte Cristo.

== Tripel Karmeliet ==
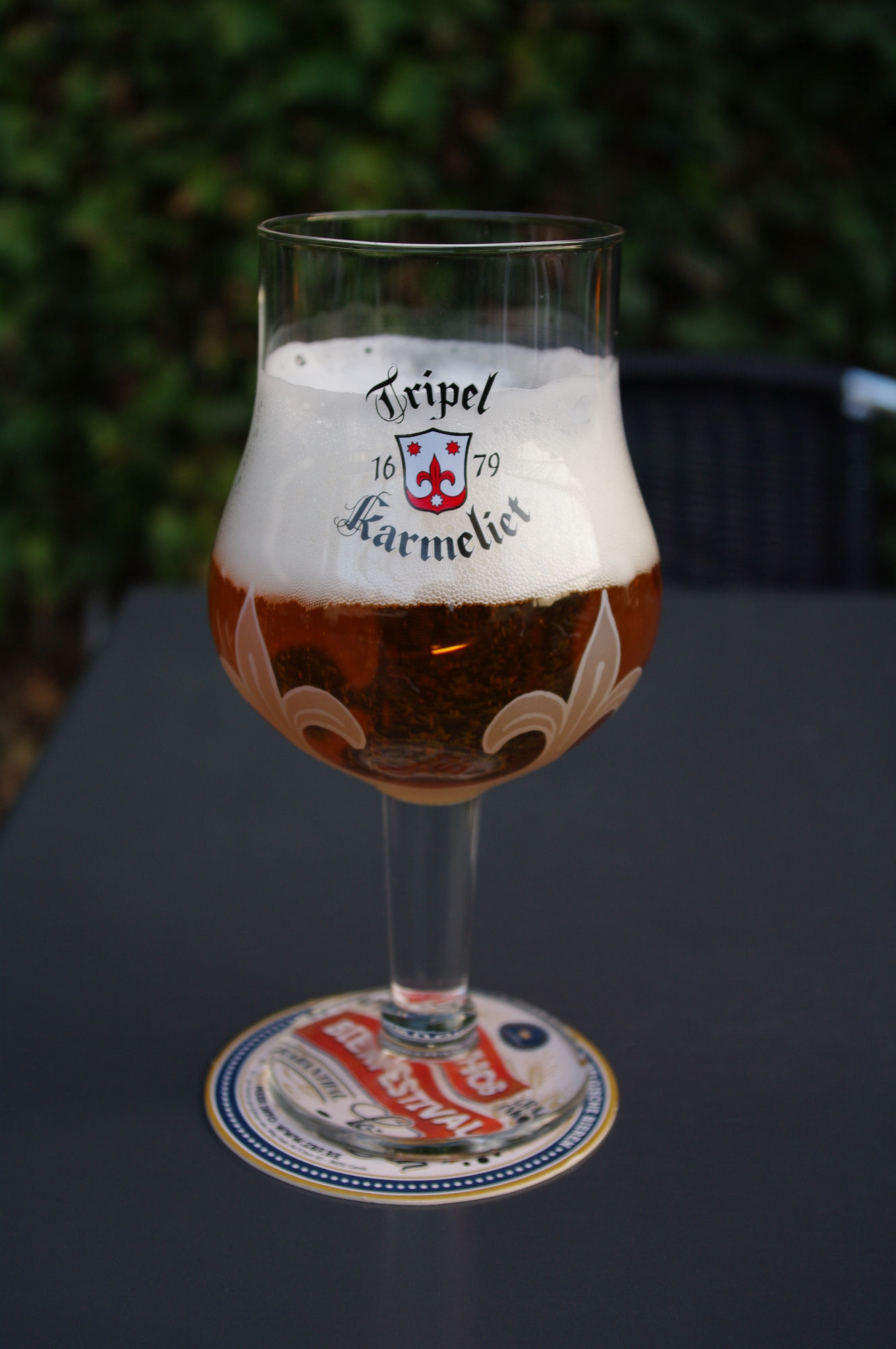
Tripel Karmeliet in a glass

Tripel Karmeliet (Dutch for "Tripel Carmelite") is a golden Belgian beer with 8.4% alcohol by volume brewed by Brouwerij Bosteels in Buggenhout, Belgium. It was first brewed in 1996 and uses three cereals: wheat, oats and barley. It is brewed according to a 1679 recipe derived from the old Carmelite convent in Dendermonde. The beer is then bottled unfiltered, a process known as bottle-conditioned.

As a result of high demand after winning the Best Pale Ale at the World Beer Awards in 2008, sales increased unexpectedly in 2009 and numerous pubs didn't have enough delivered. To meet the new demand, production was increased by 30% with the addition of a new brew vessel, accounting for an additional 6,000 hectolitres (130,000 imp gal; 160,000 US gal) annually. Tripel Karmeliet has also been given two awards in the "Best Belgian-Style Tripel" category at the World Beer Cup: gold in 1998, and silver in 2002.

Tripel Karmeliet has a complex gold to blond colour, with a little head. This is partly due to the cereals but also to the limited use of Styrian hops, the abundant herbs and fruity aroma (banana and vanilla) of the used yeast. This beer has not only the lightness and freshness of wheat, but also the creaminess of oats, and it also has a spicy, lemony dryness almost reminiscent of quinine.

== DeuS ==
DeuS, or Brut des Flandres, is a Bière de Champagne with 11.5% abv served in 75cl bottles.

During the brewing process, it is fermented over a month with two yeasts, re-fermented near Épernay in Champagne, France, and then bottled, after which it is left in a cellar for 9 months and rotated for a week, and then the yeast removed. The process of the second fermentation and storage is also referred to as the "Méthode Champenoise" or "Méthode Traditionnelle".

== Pauwel Kwak ==
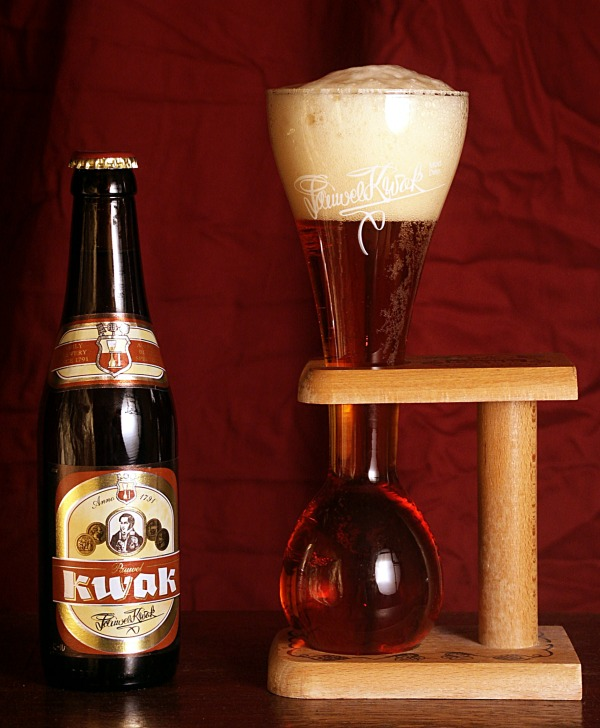
Kwak beer served in its traditional glass

Pauwel Kwak is a Belgian ale brewed since the 1980s with 8.4% ABV. Supposedly it is named after an 18th-century innkeeper and brewer, Pauwel Kwak. The beer is filtered before packaging in bottles and kegs.

As with many other Belgian beers, Kwak has a branded glass with its own distinctive shape. It is held upright in a wooden stand; the brewery claims the glass was designed by the innkeeper Pauwel Kwak in the early 18th century for coachmen who would stop at his coaching tavern and brewery named "De Hoorn", though the beer and the glass were not launched until the 1980s.
