= Herdersem =

Village in Belgium

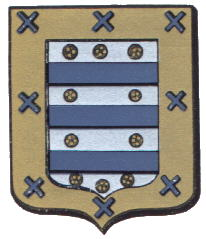
Coat of Arms of Herdersem

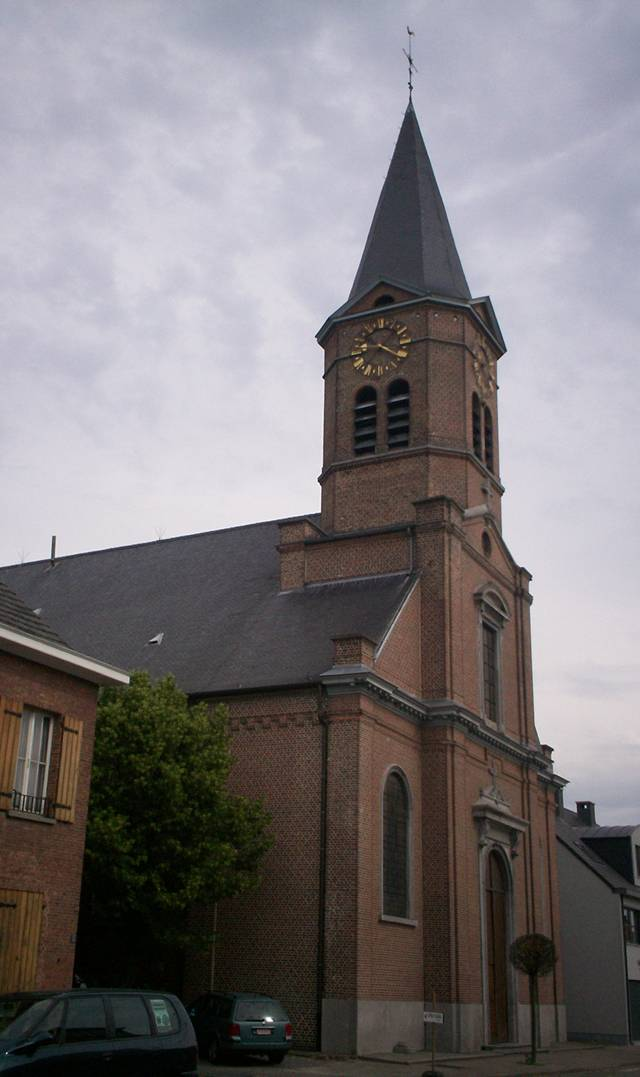
Church of Herdersem

Herdersem is a village in the Belgian province of East Flanders and is a submunicipality of Aalst. It was an independent municipality until the municipal reorganization of 1977. Baardegem is located in the Denderstreek and has 2578 inhabitants.

Herdersem was first mentioned in the year 868. During the 11th-century to 14th century it was connected to the Abbey of Affligem.

In Herdersem, an annual Saint Anthony celebration takes place in the weekend around the feast day of Anthony the Great (17 January), the patron saint of butchers who is often depicted with a pig. Herdersem also has a pig museum.
