= Bavegem =

- Village
- View of Bavegem

- Location in Belgium
- Coordinates: 50.94389°N 3.86530°E
- Country: Belgium
- Region: Flemish Region
- Province: East Flanders
- Municipality: Sint-Lievens-Houtem

Area
  - Total: 3.80 km^{2} (1.47 sq mi)

Population (2021)
  - Total: 1,447
  - Density: 381/km^{2} (986/sq mi)
- Time zone: CET

Bavegem is a village in the Denderstreek in East Flanders in Belgium, part of the municipality of Sint-Lievens-Houtem.

A specific landscape is the classified and protected landscape around "de oude linde", between Bavegem, Vlierzele and Oordegem.

Bevegem is the hometown of Inex, a large diary company.

The neighbouring villages are:

- Vlierzele
- Oordegem
- Oosterzele
- Sint-Lievens-Houtem
- Letterhoutem

== Gallery ==
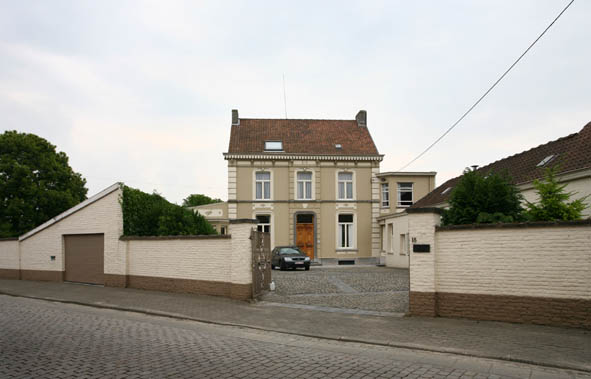
House in Bavegem

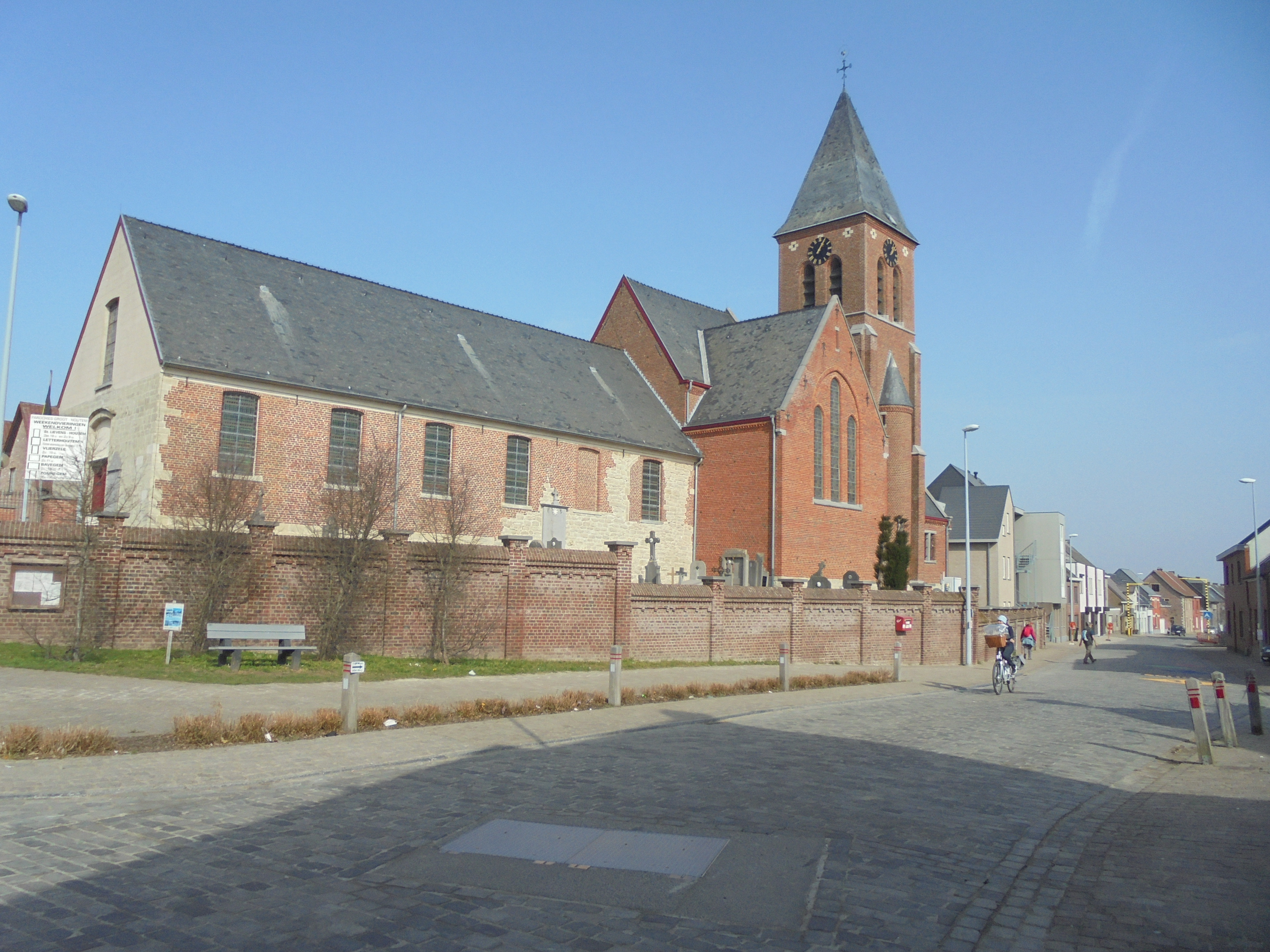
St Onkomena Church
