= Erondegem =

Coordinates: 50°56′N 3°57′E

- Village
- Erpe-Mere in East-Flanders
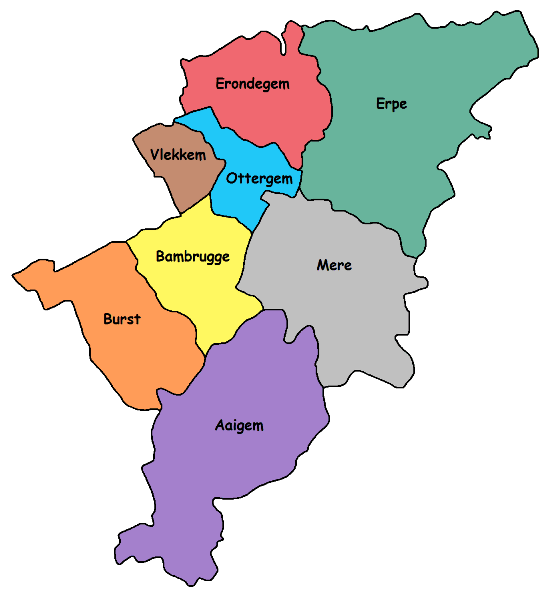
- Localisation of Erondegem in Erpe-Mere

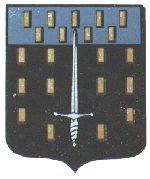
- Coat of arms

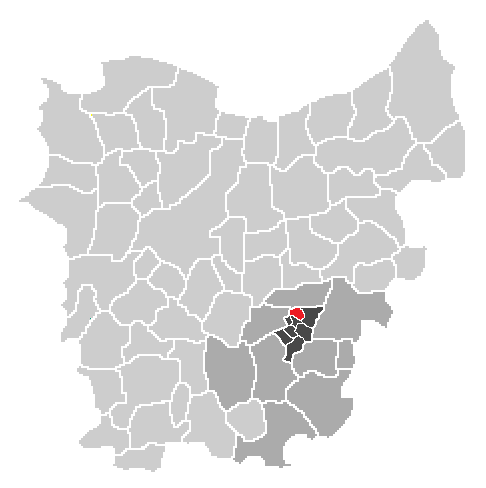
- Localisation of Erondegem in the community of Erpe-Mere in the arrondissement of Aalst in the province of East-Flanders.
- Country: Belgium
- Region: Flanders
- Province: East Flanders
- Arrondissement: Aalst
- Municipality: Erpe-Mere

Area
  - Total: 3.17 km^{2} (1.22 sq mi)
- Elevation: 0 m (0 ft)

Population (2003)
  - Total: 1,628
  - Density: 513/km^{2} (1,330/sq mi)
- Source: NIS
- Postal code: 9420

Erondegem is a sub-municipality of Erpe-Mere in Flanders, Belgium. It is located on the Molenbeek in the Denderstreek, southeast of East Flanders and belongs to the Arrondissement of Aalst. It is bordered by the sub-municipalities of Erpe and Ottergem and the municipalities of Sint-Lievens-Houtem (sub-municipality Vlierzele) and Lede (sub-municipality Impe). Erondegem has 1628 inhabitants as of 1 January 2003 and an area of 3.17 km. The population density is 513 inhabitants / km ².

== History ==
Erondegem was first mentioned in a charter of 868 or 869. In that document it was called Eroldingeheim in pago Bragbattensi. Etymologically, Flemish locations ending with –gem refer to a Germanic compound with –haim, meaning 'home' or 'residence', and a derative ending with –inga. The first part of this compound is mostly assigned to a Germanic name, in this case Erond or Erold, the name of a currently unknown person. In its totality, the compound Erondingahaim meant 'Erondingenheem, residence of the followers or tribal members of Erond. Gem-toponym are typical for the period of Frankish land taking during the Merovingian era. At the beginning of the 19th century, the village had 837 inhabitants and by 31 December 1893 it had 963 inhabitants. Erondegem had a football club KFC Olympia Erondegem, later called KVC Erpe Erondegem (after a fusion) at the Royal Belgian Football Association.

== Landmarks ==
In Erondegem the Sint-Pietersbanden Church can be found. Erondegem belongs to deanery of Lede.

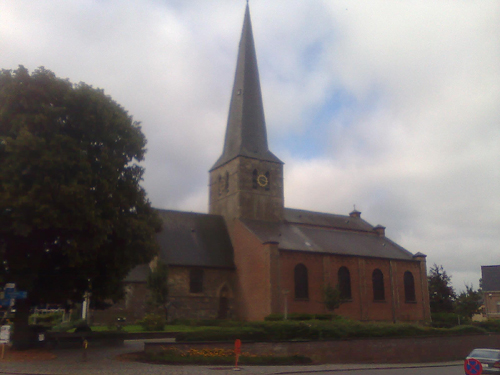
The church of Erondegem side-view

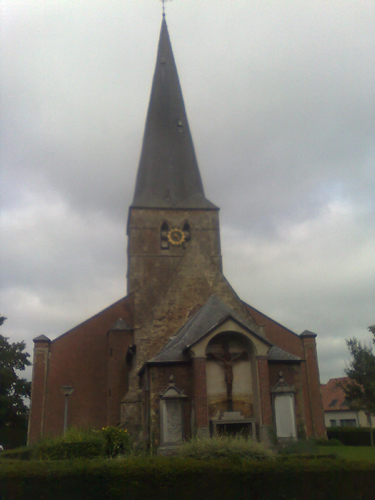
The church of Erondegem rear view

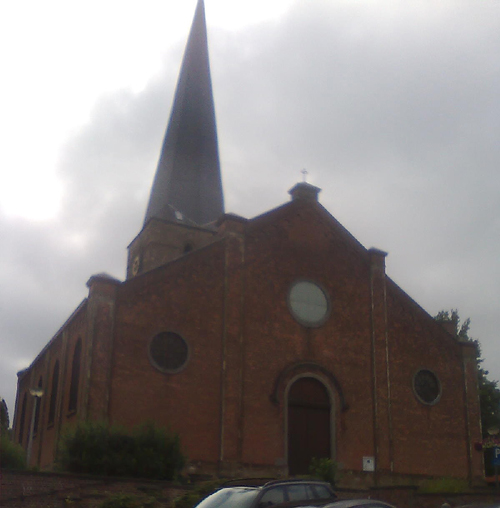
The church of Erondegem front view

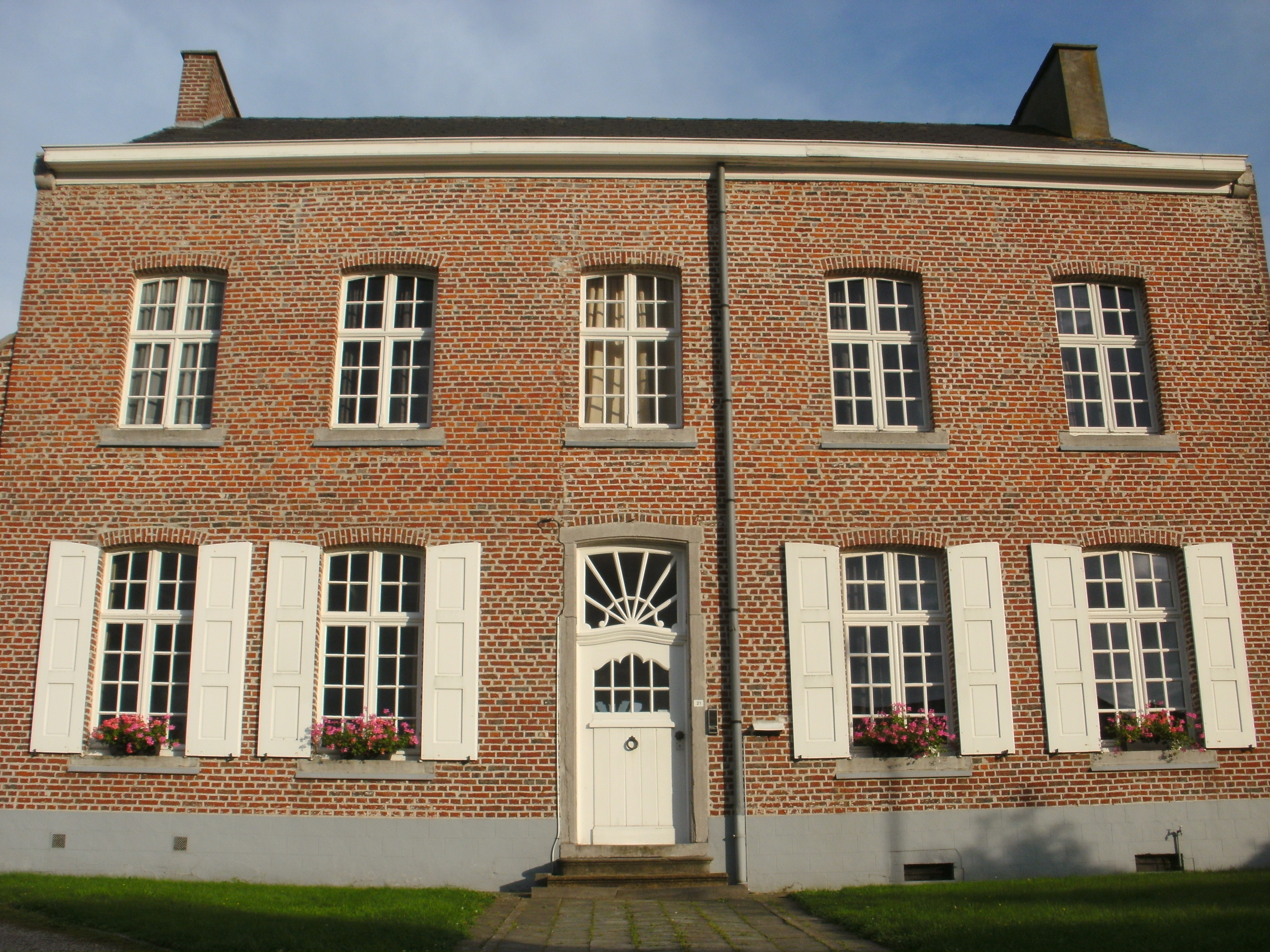
The vicarage of Erondegem

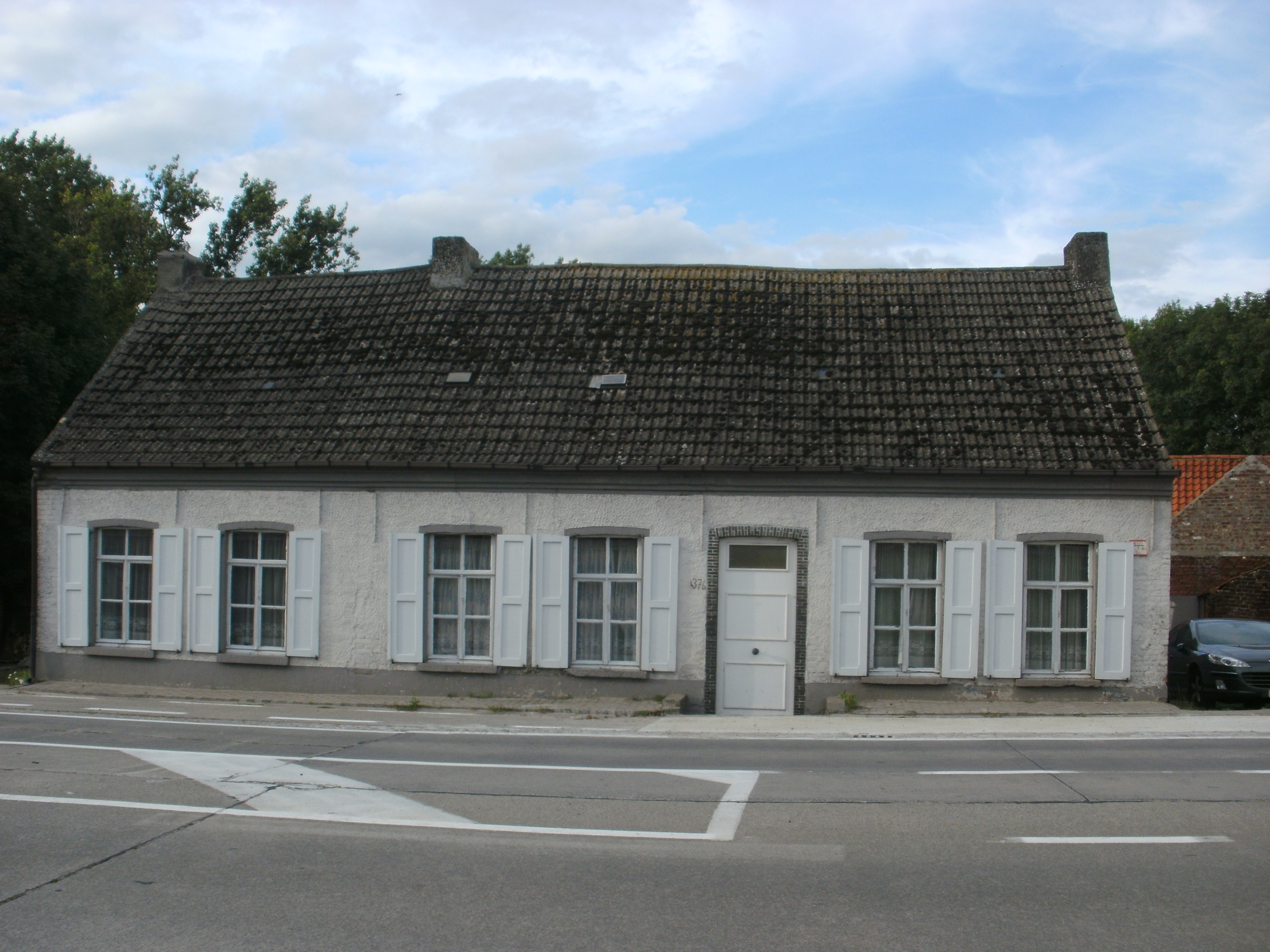
A farmhouse in Erondegem
