= Opdorp =

- Village
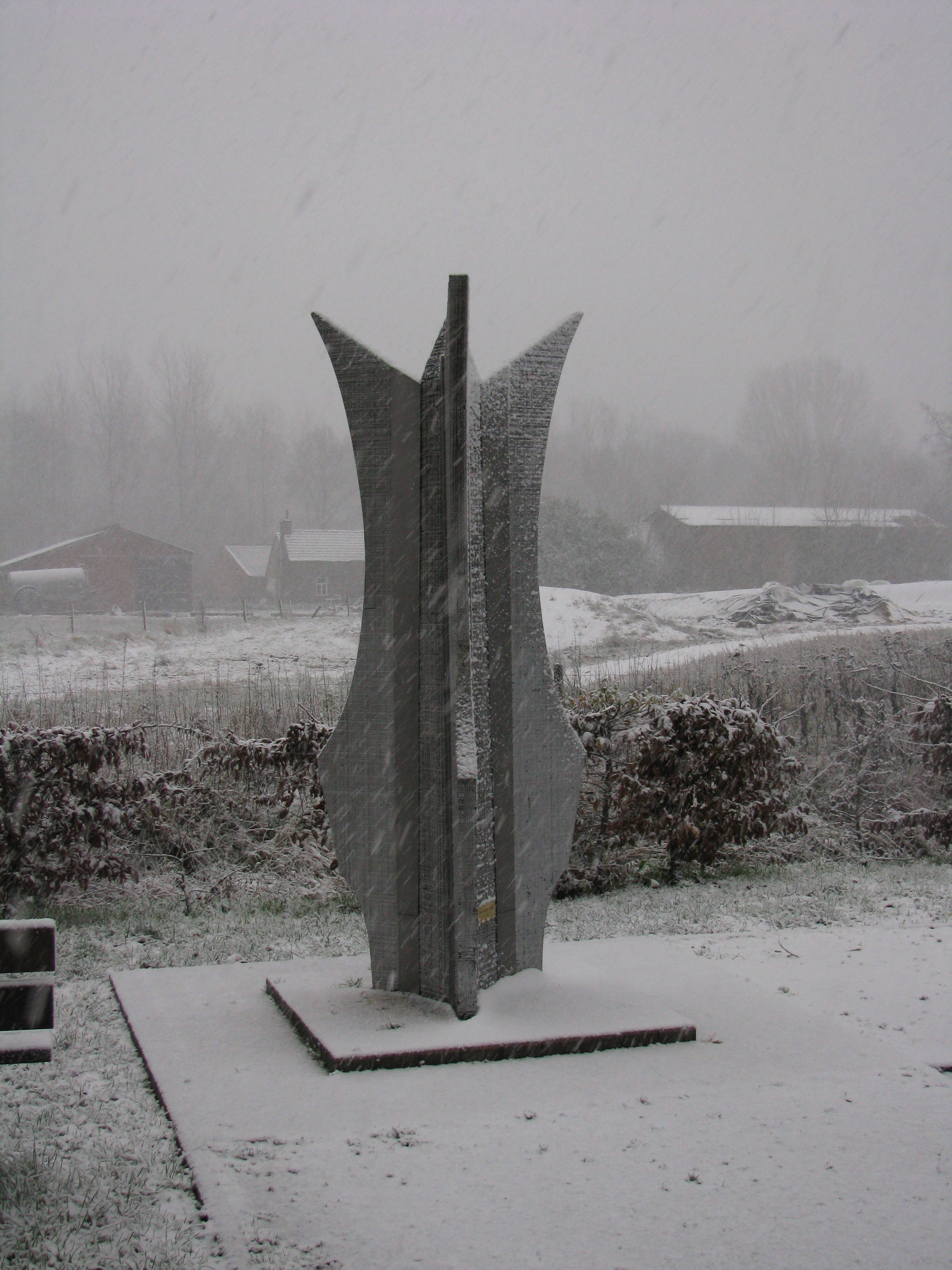
- Geographical centre of Flanders, Belgium

- Location in Belgium
- Coordinates: 51.02744°N 4.22040°E
- Country: Belgium
- Region: Flemish Region
- Province: East Flanders
- Municipality: Buggenhout

Area
  - Total: 5.05 km^{2} (1.95 sq mi)

Population (2021)
  - Total: 2,226
  - Density: 441/km^{2} (1,140/sq mi)
- Time zone: CET

Opdorp is one of the three towns making up the municipality of Buggenhout in East Flanders, Belgium. Sometimes it is classified as part of the Denderstreek.

Opdorp is at the geographical centre of Flanders, Belgium. It is also the point at which three provinces meet: Brabant, Antwerp, and East Flanders.

Opdorp developed around a triangular dries (village square). The dries contains a chapel and the village pump. The town hall, school and former monastery were built around the square.

== Gallery ==
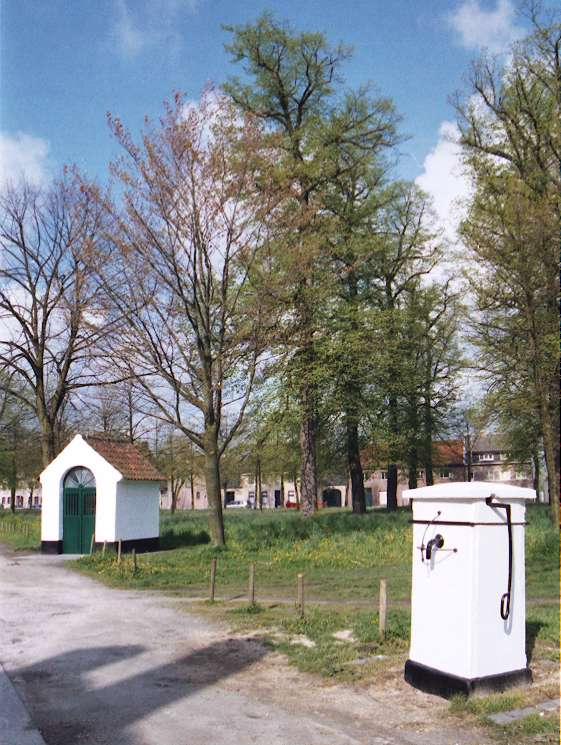
Dries chapel and village pump

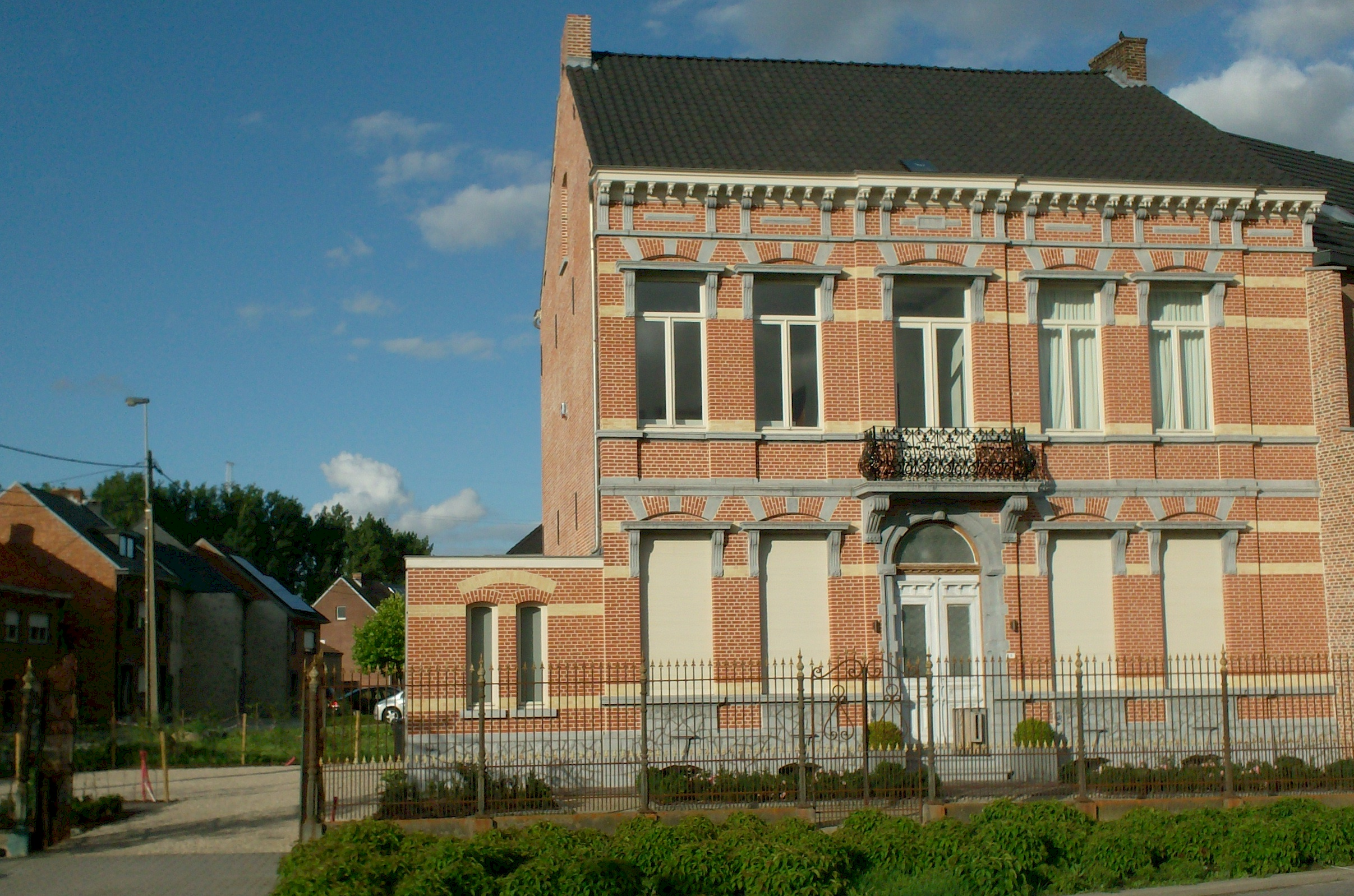
Former brewery Van Den Bossche

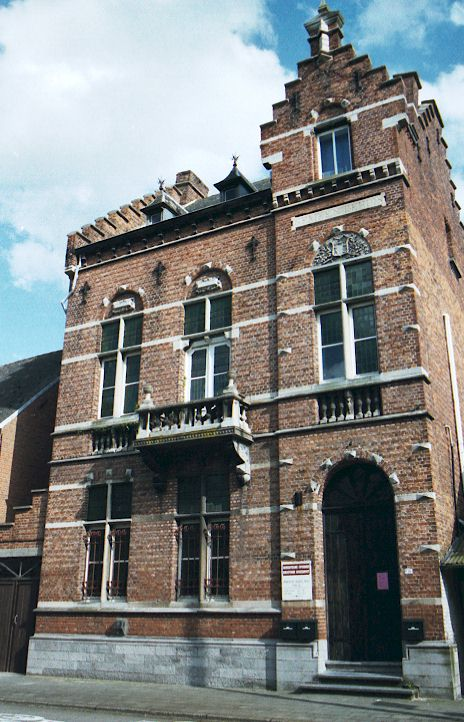
Former town hall

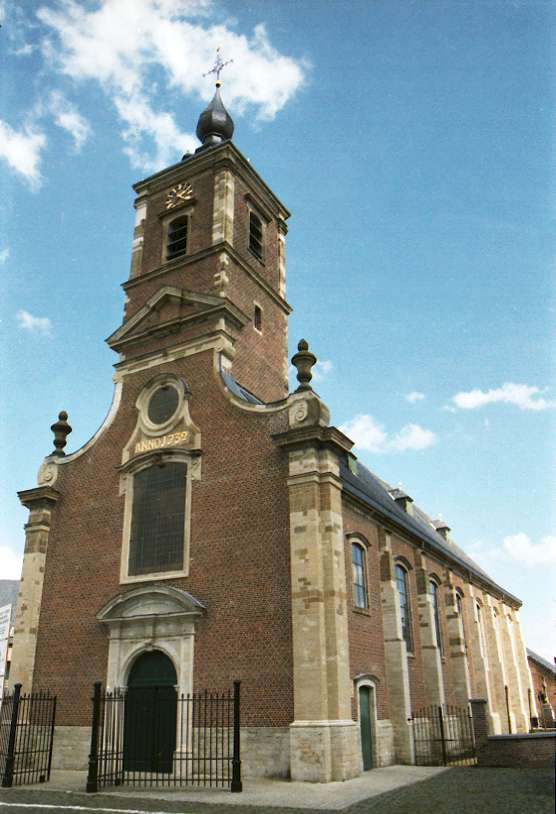
St Amandus Church

== See also ==
- Nil-Saint-Vincent-Saint-Martin
