= Denderhoutem =

- Village
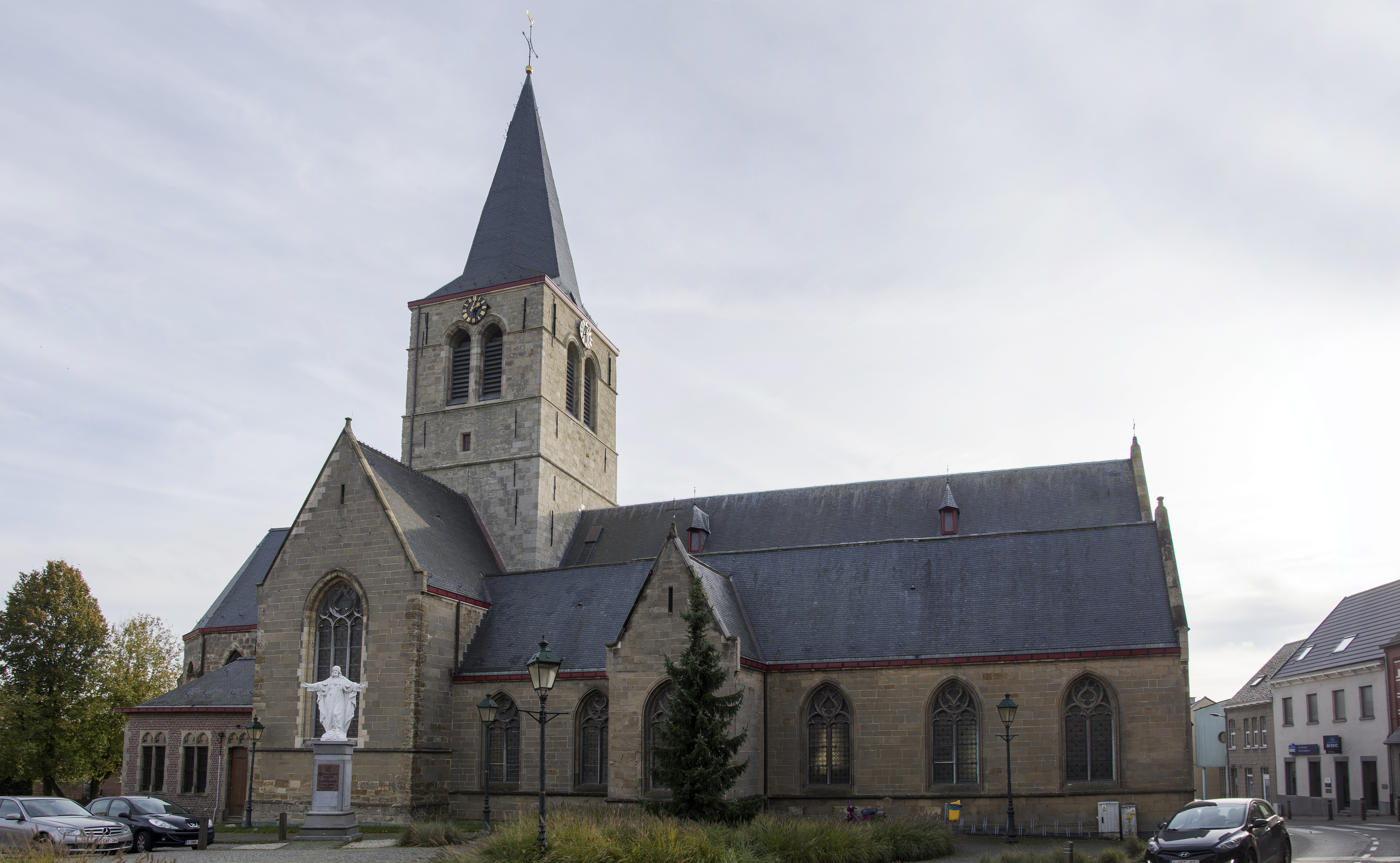
- Sint-Amanduskerk in Denderhoutem

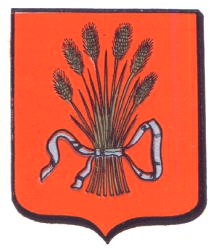
- Seal

- Location in Belgium
- Coordinates: 50°52′N 4°01′E
- Country: Belgium
- Region: Flemish Region
- Province: East Flanders
- Arrondissement: Aalst
- Municipality: Haaltert

Area
  - Total: 12.28 km^{2} (4.74 sq mi)

Population (2021)
  - Total: 5,960
  - Density: 485/km^{2} (1,260/sq mi)
- Time zone: CET

Denderhoutem is a village, located in the Denderstreek in the Flemish province of East Flanders, in Belgium. Since 1977, it has been part of the municipality of Haaltert.

The coat of arms shows a garb, most likely a symbol for agriculture. The old seals of the local council, dating from the 15th and 16th centuries, showed a tree, with two small shields on either side, one with the lion of Flanders, the other with the arms of Burgundy. Why the council in the early 19th century applied for the garb instead is not known.

== Residents ==
Mr. Johannes Josef van de Velde was a third class passenger on the RMS Titanic in 1912, his last place of residence is listed as Denderhoutem. Mr. van de Velde did not survive the sinking and his body was not recovered. He left behind a wife, four children and siblings.

Between 1880s and WW1 perhaps 500 emigrants left Denderhautem and area, located south of Aalst in East Flanders. The main areas of settlement were Detroit, southwest Ontario, California and British Columbia. One source of information on them is: Denerdhautem naar Amerika

== Events ==
- Boerenmarkt
- Driekoningen (first Saturday of the year)
- Grote Kermis (first Sunday of September)
- Jaarmarkt
- Kleine Kermis (2 weeks after Easter)
- Mini-Rock
- Stopselquiz
- Trotinettenkoers
- Zonnestraatfeesten

== External links (in Dutch) ==
- AtomTV
- Radio PROS (local radiostation)
