= Malheur Brewery =

Brewery in Belgium

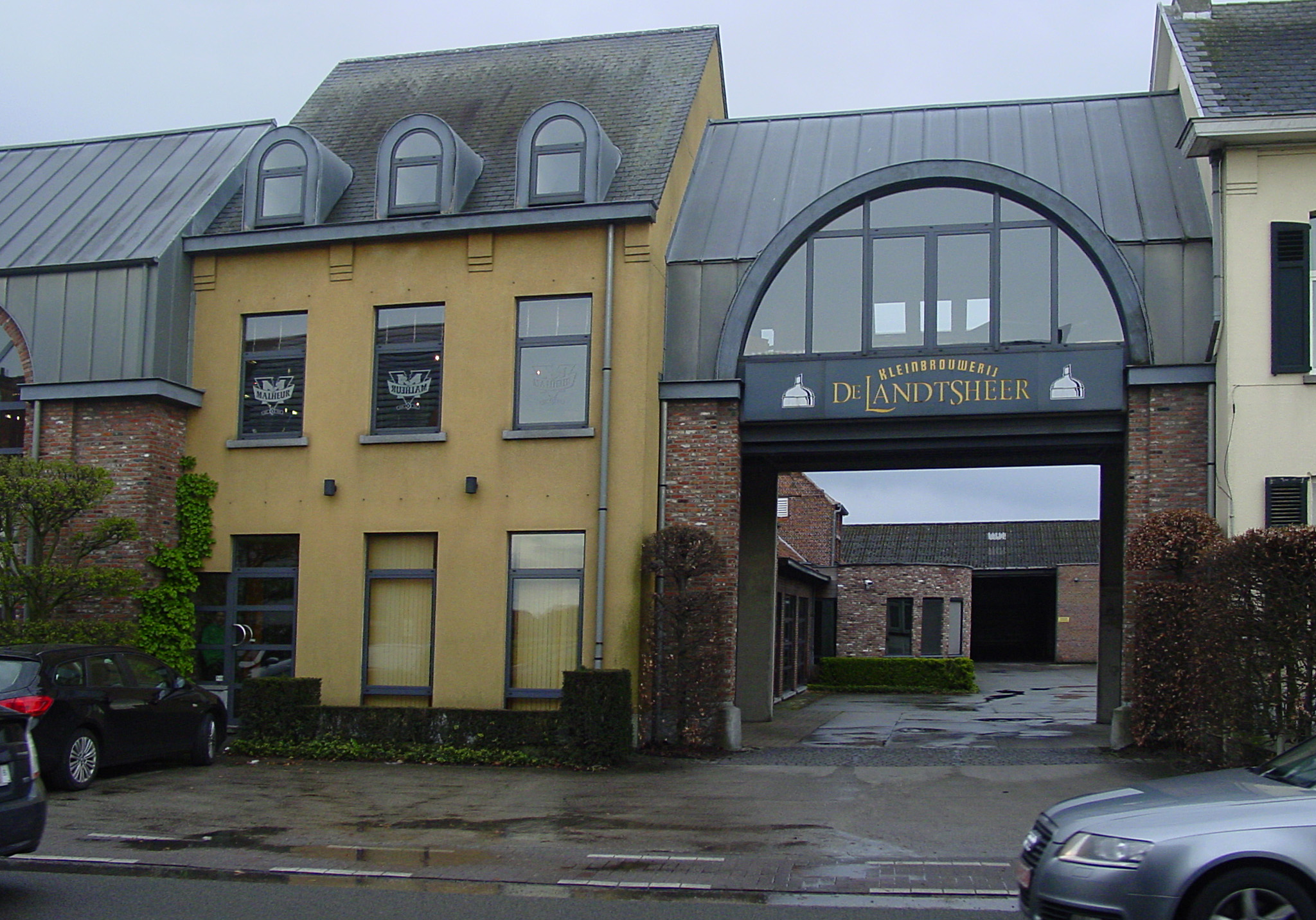
Main entrance of the brewery

Malheur Brewery (Brouwerij Malheur) is a brewery in Buggenhout, Belgium, formerly named De Landtsheer. It is known for its Malheur brew.

== Description ==
The Malheur is a unique pale ale that is as close to a champagne as a beer can get. The yeast used is a similar to champagne yeast, which is what gives the beer the mouth feel, carbonation, and color of a "champagne", and more appealing than a Freixenet Brut. The ABV is lower than Freixenet. Aromas of huge lemon, lemon zest, orange peel, apricot, herbal, floral, grass, earth, pepper, honey, and spicy yeast esters. Taste is of grain, grape juice, and spices with an alcohol kick. It is often poured into a champagne glass rather than a beer mug, and served at room temperature.
