= Briel (parish) =

Coordinates: 51°02′N 4°11′E

- Parish
- Interactive map of Briel
- Country: Belgium
- Region: Flanders
- Province: East Flanders
- Arrondissement: Dendermonde
- Municipality: Buggenhout and Dendermonde
- Sub-municipality: Baasrode (part)

Briel or Den Briel is a parish in the Denderstreek in East Flanders, Belgium. A part of the parish is located in the municipality of Buggenhout, with the other part in the sub-municipality Baasrode in the city Dendermonde.
