= Denderstreek =

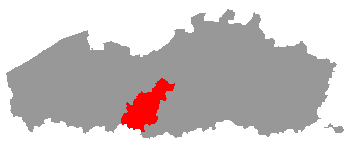
- Location of the Denderstreek in Flanders
- Country: Belgium
- Region: Flanders
- Province: East Flanders
- Capital: Aalst

Area
  - Total: 682.22 km^{2} (263.41 sq mi)

Population (2010)
  - Total: 381,594
  - Density: 559.34/km^{2} (1,448.7/sq mi)

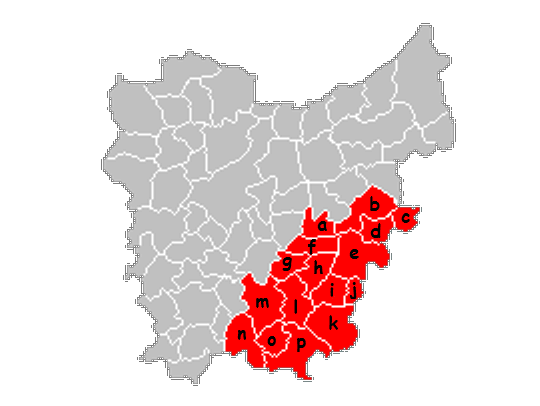
Location in East Flanders a= Wichelen b= Dendermonde c= Buggenhout d= Lebbeke e= Aalst f= Lede g= Sint-Lievens-Houtem h= Erpe-Merei= Haaltert j= Denderleeuw k= Ninove l= Herzele m= Zottegem n= Brakel o= Lierde p= Geraardsbergen

The Denderstreek or Denderland is a region in Belgium. It is named after the river Dender. Though the river stretches over three provinces, Hainaut, East Flanders and Flemish Brabant, the region called after the river is situated in East Flanders. Most of the Denderstreek is part of the Scheldeland (Scheldtland), the rest is part of the Flemish Ardennes.

== Etymology ==
The Dutch word streek means "region". Thus, Denderstreek means "Dender Region".

== Towns and communities ==
The Denderstreek includes the following towns and communities:

- Aalst contains: Aalst, Baardegem, Erembodegem, Gijzegem, Herdersem, Hofstade, Meldert, Moorsel, Nieuwerkerken and Terjoden
- Buggenhout contains: Briel, Buggenhout, Opdorp and Opstal
- Denderleeuw contains: Denderleeuw, Iddergem and Welle
- Dendermonde contains: Appels, Baasrode, Dendermonde, Grembergen, Mespelare, Oudegem, Schoonaarde and Sint-Gillis-bij-Dendermonde
- Erpe-Mere contains: Aaigem, Bambrugge, Burst, Den Dotter, Egem, Erondegem, Erpe, Mere, Ottergem and Vlekkem
- Geraardsbergen contains: Geraardsbergen, Goeferdinge, Grimminge, Idegem, Moerbeke, Nederboelare, Nieuwenhove, Onkerzele, Ophasselt, Overboelare, Schendelbeke, Smeerebbe-Vloerzegem (Smeerebbe and Vloerzegem), Viane, Waarbeke, Zandbergen and Zarlardinge
- Haaltert contains: Den Dotter, Denderhoutem, Haaltert, Heldergem, Kerksken and Terjoden
- Herzele contains: Borsbeke, Herzele, Hillegem, Ressegem, Sint-Antelinks, Sint-Lievens-Esse, Steenhuize-Wijnhuize and Woubrechtegem
- Lebbeke contains: Denderbelle, Lebbeke and Wieze
- Lede contains: Impe, Lede, Oordegem, Papegem, Smetlede and Wanzele
- Ninove contains: Appelterre-Eichem, Aspelare, Denderwindeke, Lieferinge, Meerbeke, Lebeke, Nederhasselt, Neigem, Ninove, Okegem, Outer, Pollare and Voorde
- Sint-Lievens-Houtem contains: Bavegem, Letterhoutem, Sint-Lievens-Houtem, Vlierzele and Zonnegem
- Wichelen contains: Schellebelle, Serskamp and Wichelen
- Zottegem contains: Elene, Erwetegem, Godveerdegem, Grotenberge, Leeuwergem, Oombergen, Sint-Goriks-Oudenhove, Sint-Maria-Oudenhove, Strijpen, Velzeke-Ruddershove and Zottegem

Note that Den Dotter is part of Erpe-Mere, and Haaltert and Terjoden are part of Aalst and Haaltert.

== Tourism ==
- There are several bicycle routes in the Denderstreek, including the Molenbeekroute (Millbrook route), Denderende steden (Dendering towns), the Reuzenroute (giants route) and the Ros Beiaardroute (steed bayard route).
- There are also motorcycle and car routes like Denderroute zuid (Dender route south).

== Watercourses ==
- The Dender, the main river in the Dender basin.
- The Molenbeek-Ter Erpenbeek in Zottegem, Herzele, Haaltert, Erpe-Mere and Aalst (left bank) as a tributary of the Dender.
- The Molenbeek (millbrook) in Zottegem, Herzele, Erpe-Mere, Sint-Lievens-Houtem, Lede and Wichelen, being one of the Drie Molenbeken (three millbrooks), part of the drainage basin the Drie Molenbeken as a tributary of the Bovenschelde.
