= Sint-Lievens-Houtem =

- Municipality
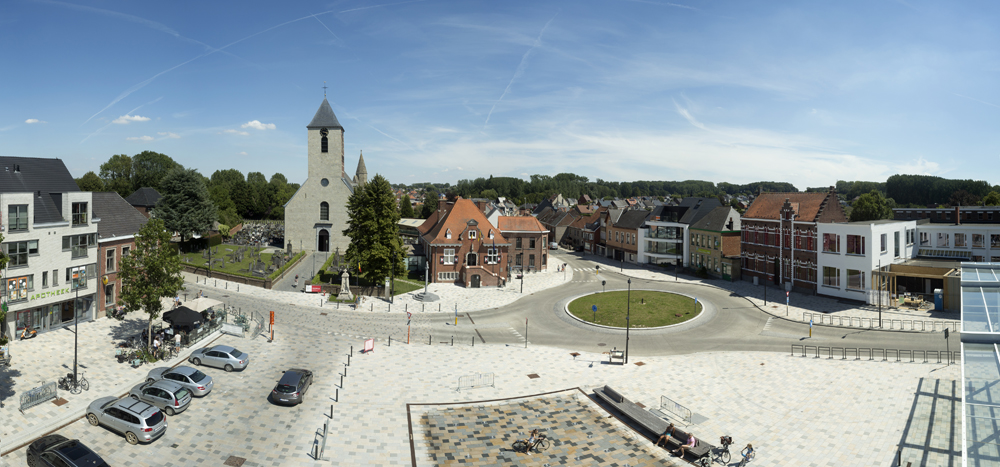

- Flag Coat of arms

- The municipality in the Aalst arrondissement in the province of East Flanders
- Interactive map of Sint-Lievens-Houtem
- Location in Belgium
- Coordinates: 50°55′N 03°52′E
- Country: Belgium
- Community: Flemish Community
- Region: Flemish Region
- Province: East Flanders
- Arrondissement: Aalst

Government
  - Mayor: Tim De Knyf (Nieuw Houtem)
  - Governing party: Nieuw Houtem

Area
  - Total: 27.05 km^{2} (10.44 sq mi)

Population (2018-01-01)
  - Total: 10,255
  - Density: 379.1/km^{2} (981.9/sq mi)
- Postal codes: 9520-9521
- NIS code: 41063
- Area codes: 053
- Website: www.sint-lievens-houtem.be

Sint-Lievens-Houtem (Dutch: [sɪnt ˌlivəns ˈɦʌutəm]; French: Hautem-Saint-Liévin, not officially recognized) is a Dutch-speaking municipality of Belgium. It is located in the Denderstreek and at the edge of the Flemish Ardennes, the hilly southern part of the province of East Flanders (Flemish Region). Sint-Lievens-Houtem is crossed by the Molenbeek in Vlierzele, Zonnegem and Letterhoutem.

It is named after Saint Livinus (Sint Lieven in Dutch), a Christian saint believed to have been buried there.

The town comprises the former municipalities of Bavegem, Letterhoutem, Sint-Lievens-Houtem proper, Vlierzele, and Zonnegem, and the hamlets of Espenhoek, Cotthem, and Hoogveld, formerly parts of Oombergen.

== Houtem Jaarmarkt ==
In November every year, Sint-Lievens-Houtem holds a winter fair and livestock market, the Houtem Jaarmarkt, at which hundreds of traders sell cattle and horses. In 2010 it was inscribed on the UNESCO Representative List of the Intangible Cultural Heritage of Humanity.

== Places of interest ==
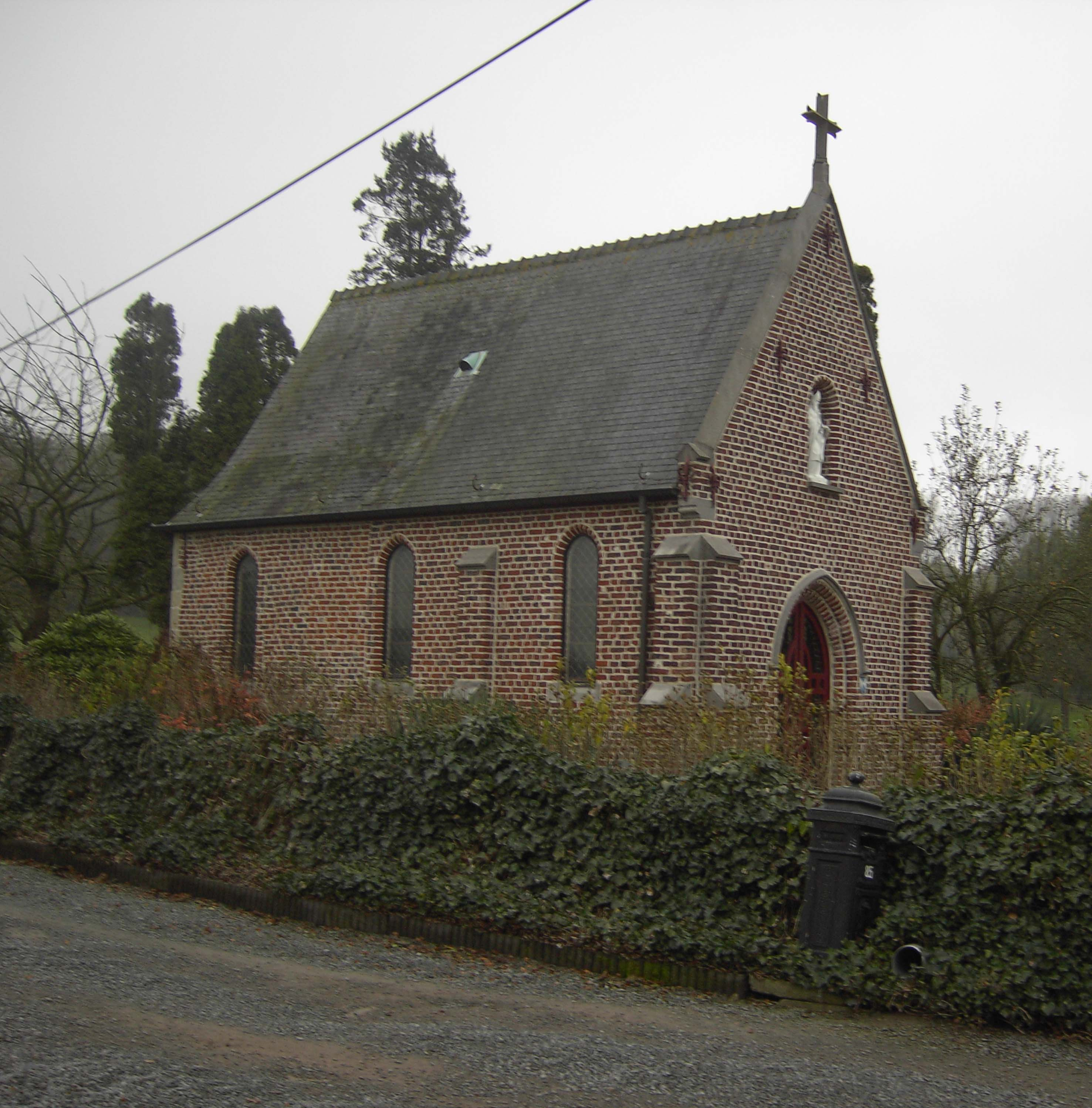
Livinus Chapel (2008)

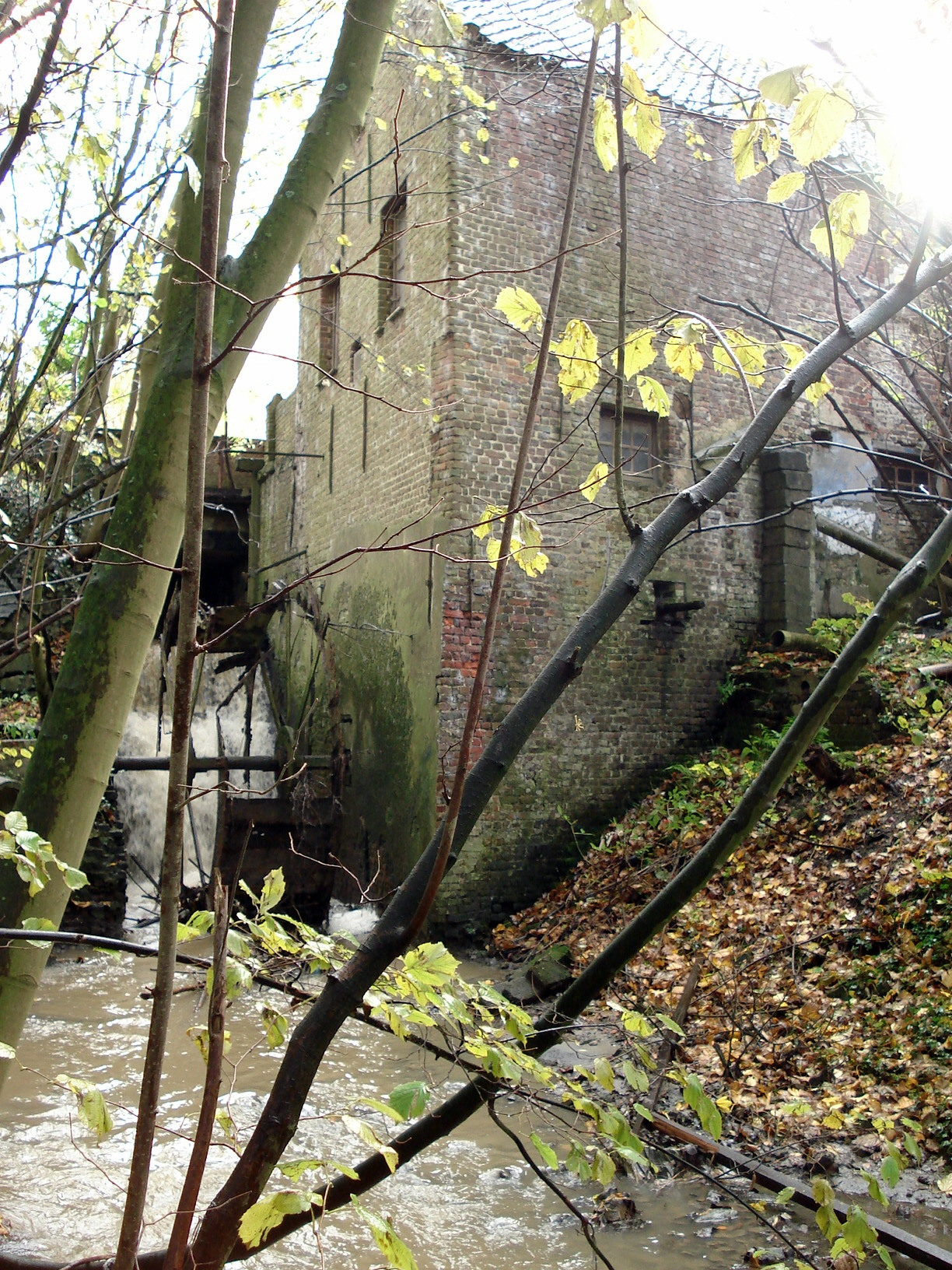
Former water mill (2008)
