= Baardegem =

Village in Belgium

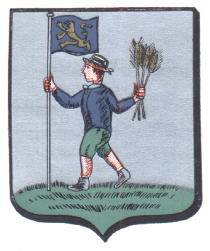
Coat of Arms of Gijzegem

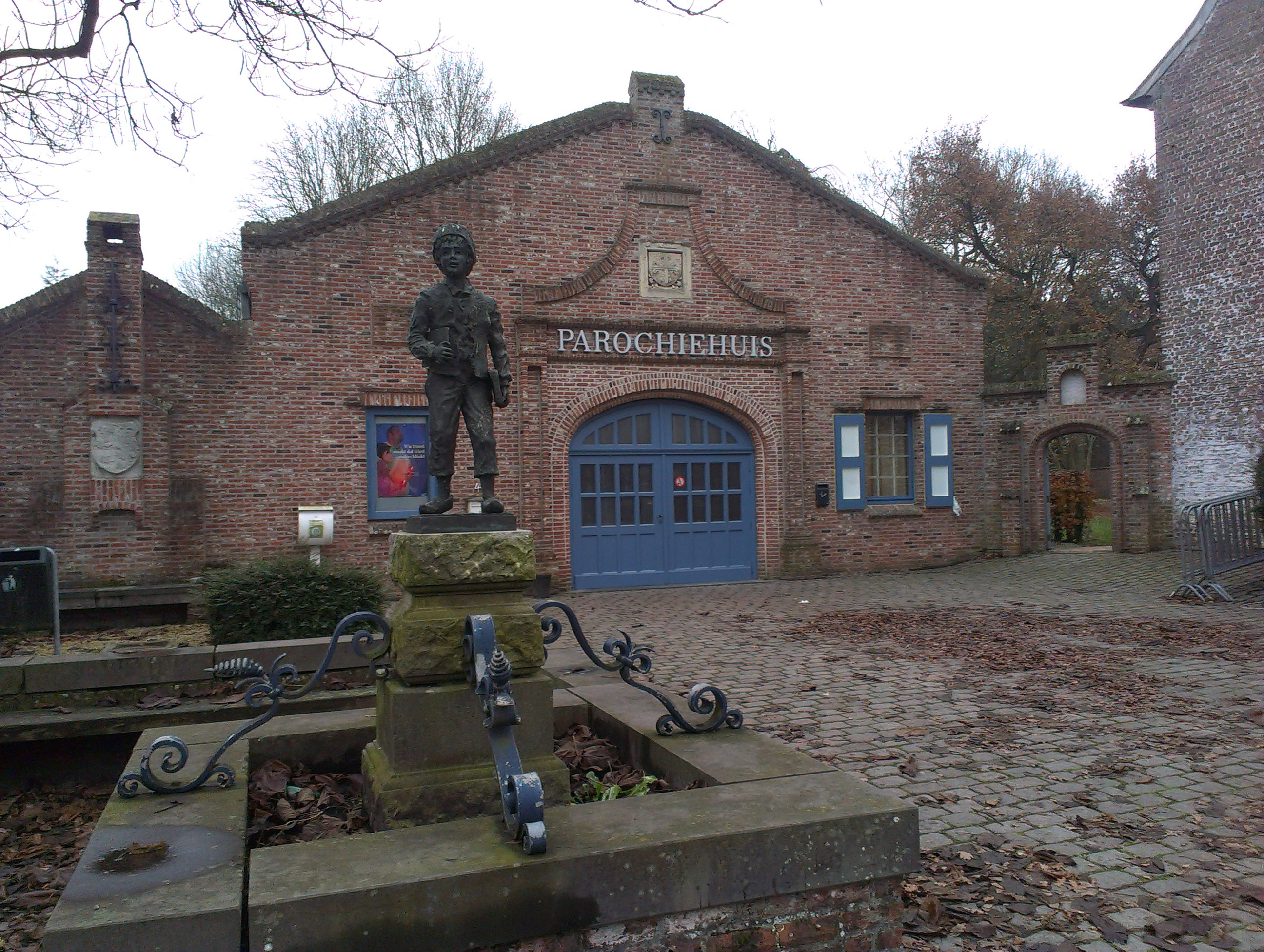
Parish house with statue of Jan Frans Vonck who was born in Baardegem

Baardegem is a village in the Belgian province of East Flanders and is a submunicipality of Aalst. It was an independent municipality until the municipal reorganization of 1977. Baardegem is located in the Denderstreek. It measures 605 hectares and has 1948 inhabitants.

Baardegem was first mentioned in 1180 as "Bardenghien". It formed one parish with Meldert until 1258. It was dependent on the Abbey of Affligem. In 1689 the village was plundered and burned down by the French. During the French Revolution it was separated from the Duchy of Brabant and became part of the Escaut department.

Inhabitants of Baardegem are nicknamed in Dutch language varinkdorsers, translated fern threshers.
