= Aalst, Belgium =

Municipality in Flemish Community, Belgium

Aalst Oilsjt (Brabantian): Alost (French)
- City and municipality
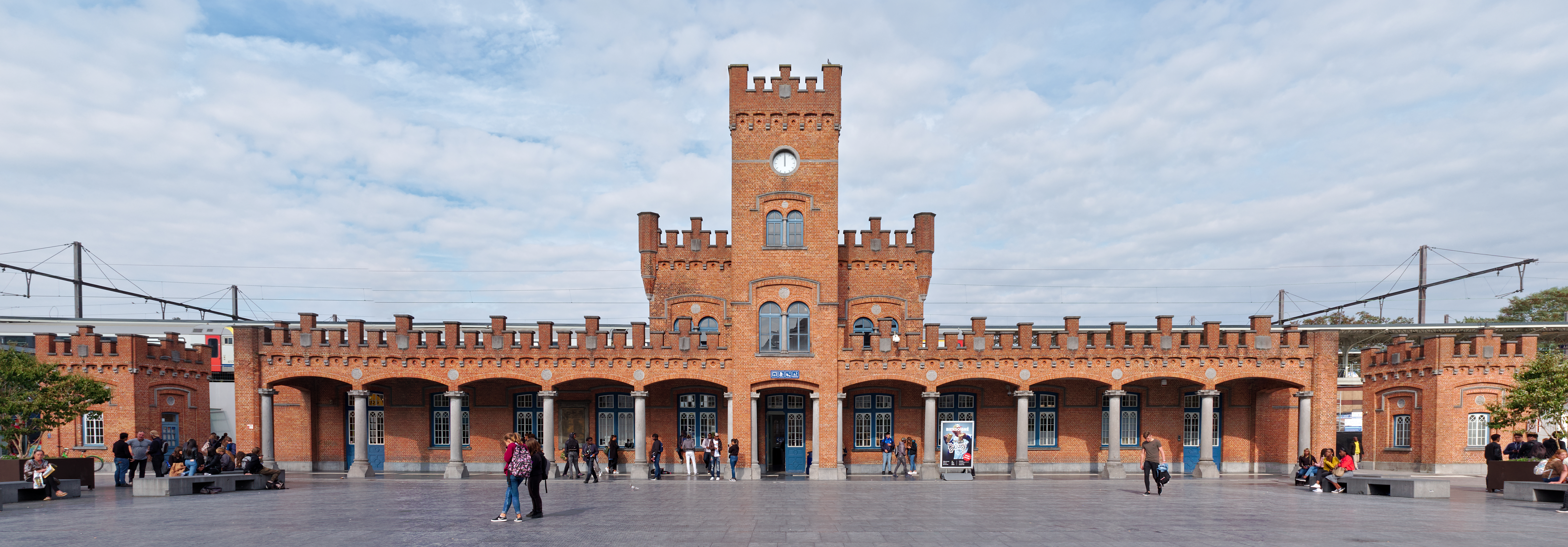
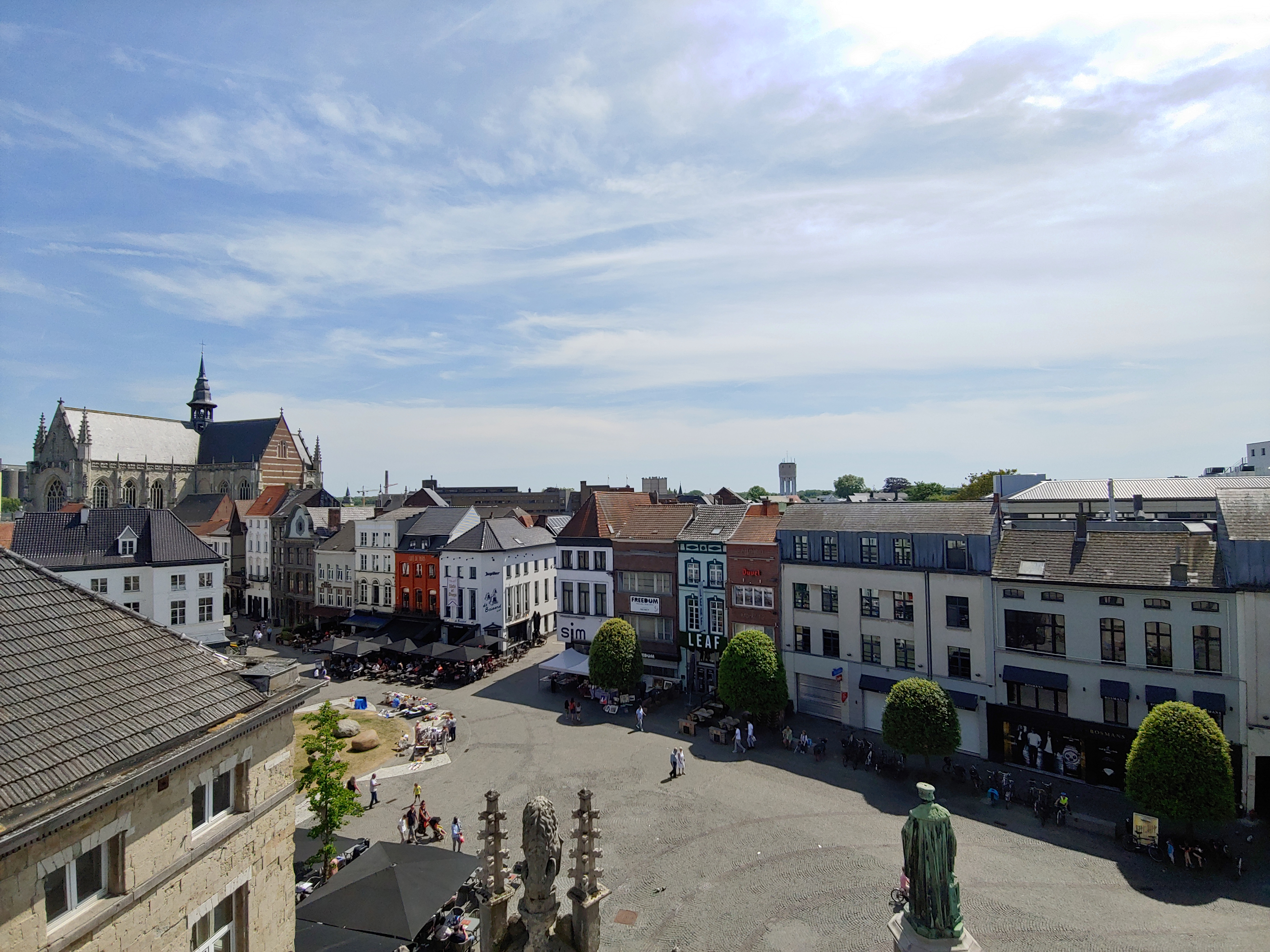
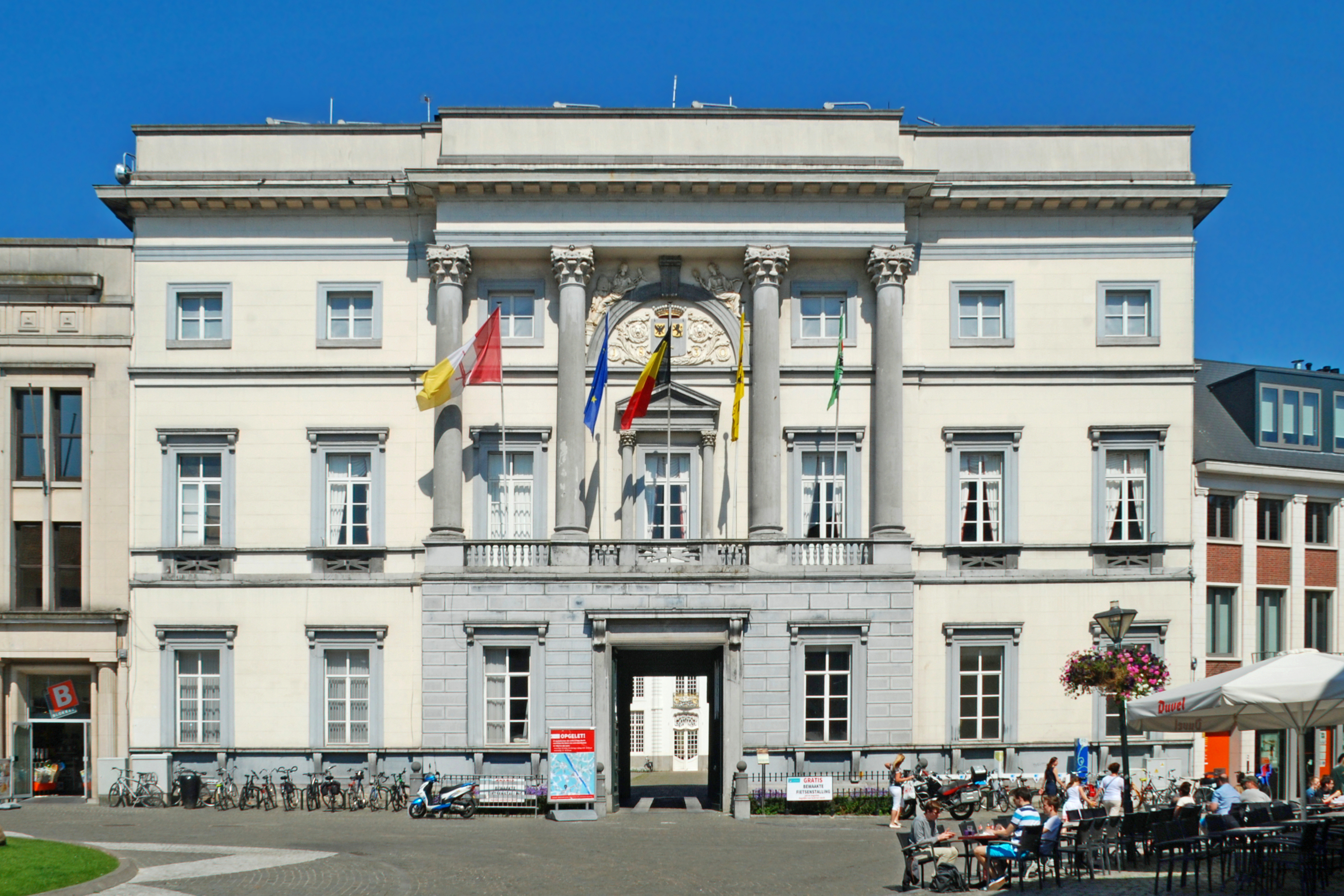
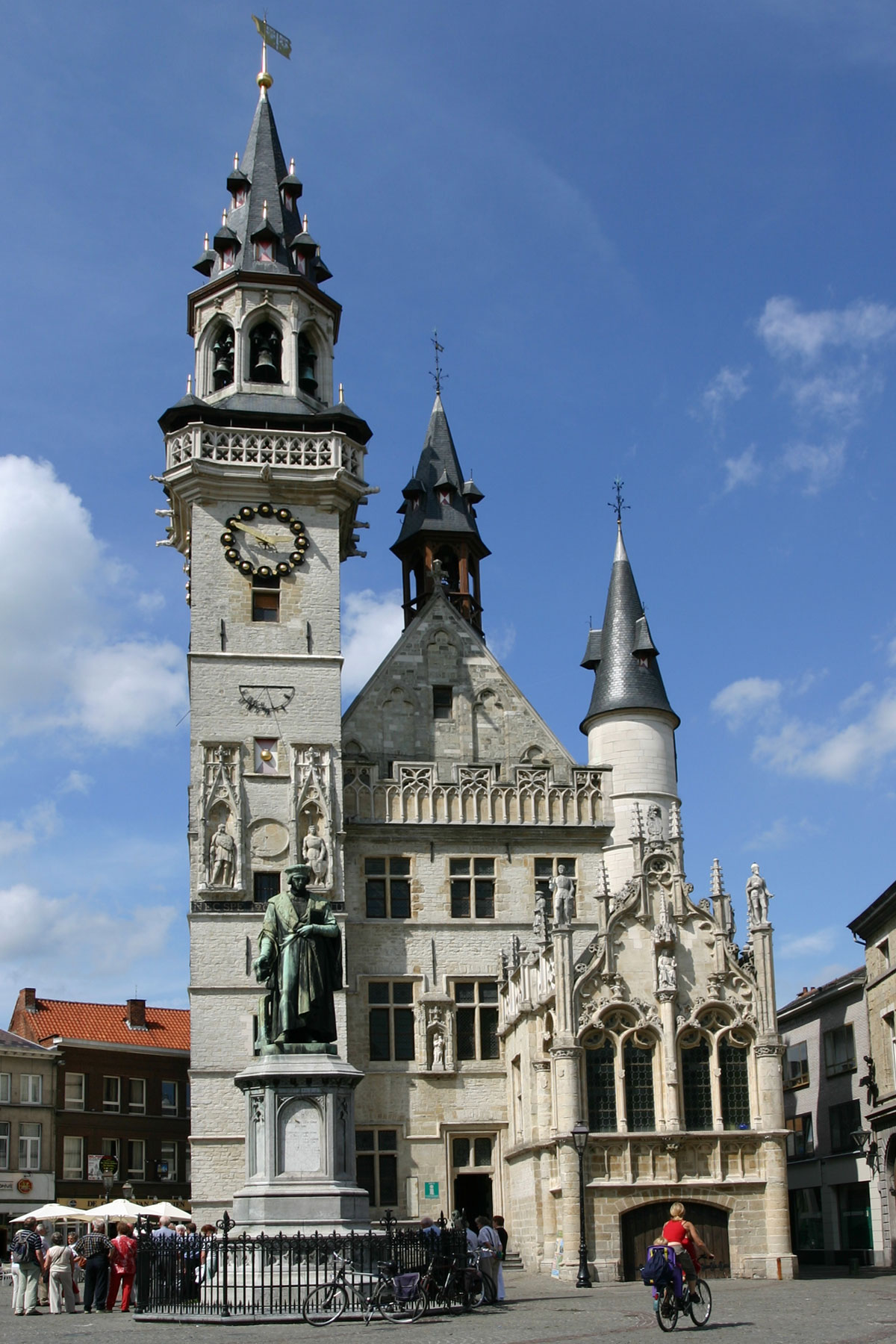
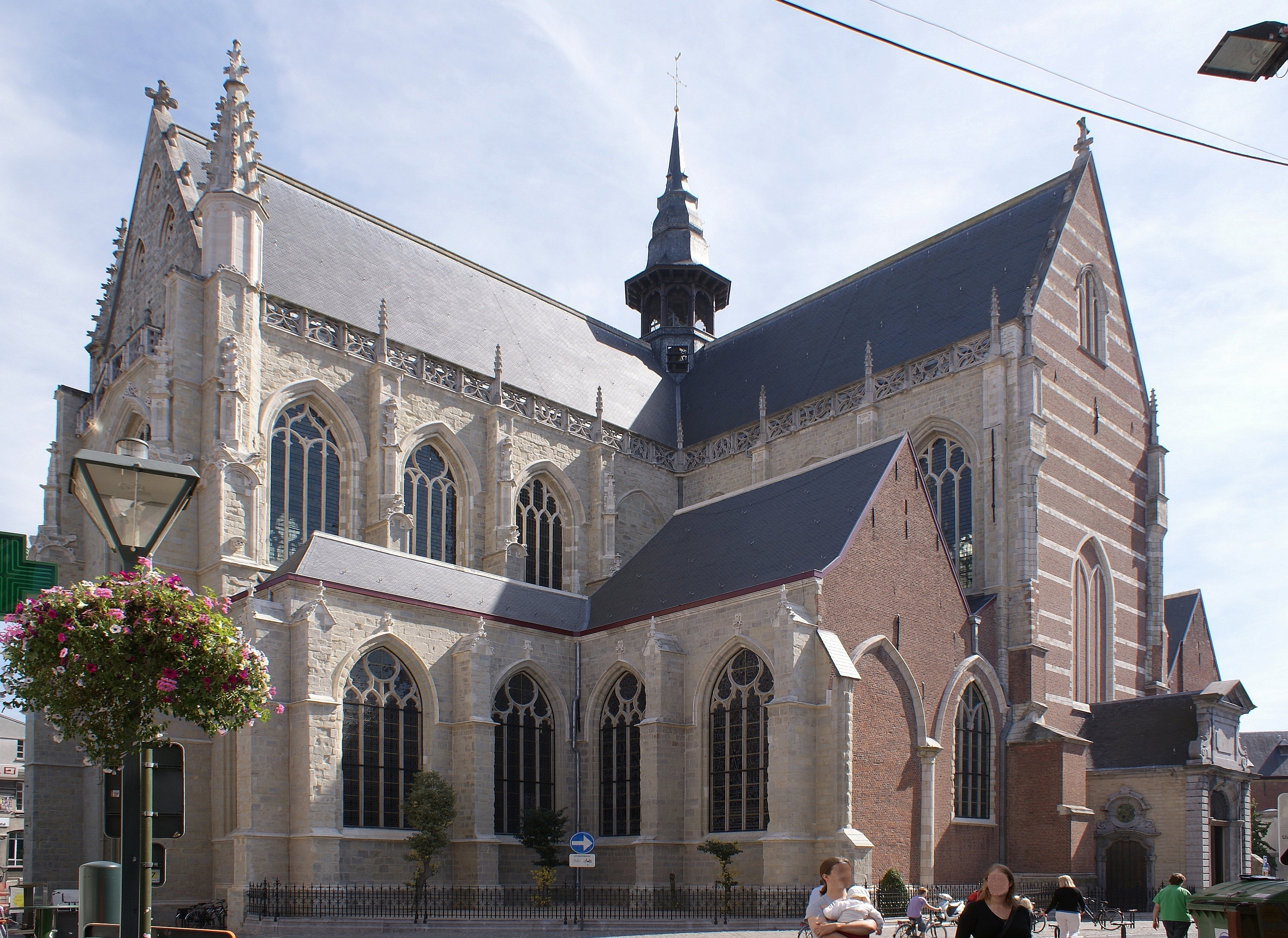
- Aalst Railway Station Grote Markt Aalst City Hall Schepenhuis St Martin's Church

- Flag Coat of arms

- Location of Aalst in East Flanders
- Interactive map of Aalst
- Location in Belgium
- Coordinates: 50°56′18″N 04°02′21″E
- Country: Belgium
- Community: Flemish Community
- Region: Flemish Region
- Province: East Flanders
- Arrondissement: Aalst

Government
  - Mayor: Christoph D'Haese (N-VA)
  - Governing parties: N-VA, Open VLD, CD&V

Area
  - Total: 78.66 km^{2} (30.37 sq mi)

Population (2022-01-01)
  - Total: 88,854
  - Density: 1,130/km^{2} (2,926/sq mi)
- Postal codes: 9300, 9308, 9310, 9320
- NIS code: 41002
- Area codes: 053
- Website: www.aalst.be

Aalst (Dutch pronunciation: [aːlst]; French: Alost, pronounced [alɔst]; Brabantian: Oilsjt) is a city and municipality in the province of East Flanders in the Flemish Region of Belgium. It is located on the Dender River, about 31 kilometres (19 mi) northwest of Brussels. The municipality comprises the city of Aalst itself and the villages of Baardegem, Erembodegem, Gijzegem, Herdersem, Hofstade, Meldert, Moorsel and Nieuwerkerken; it is the country's tenth largest city by population with 92,131 inhabitants. Aalst is crossed by the Molenbeek-Ter Erpenbeek in Aalst and Hofstade. The current mayor of Aalst is Christoph D'Haese, from the New-Flemish Alliance party. The town has a long-standing folkloric feud with Dendermonde, north along the same river, which dates from the Middle Ages.

== History ==
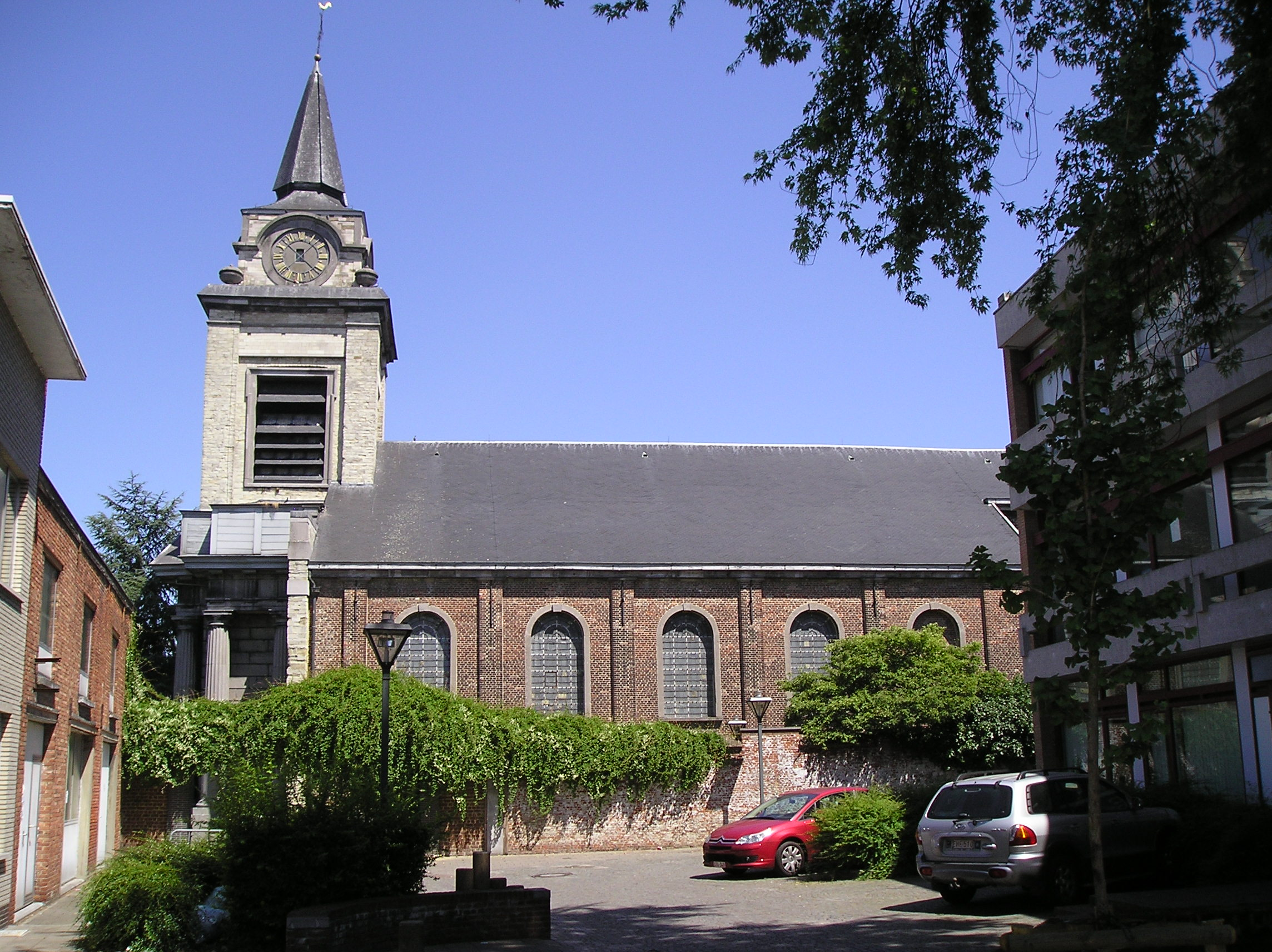
Church of the beguinage, Aalst

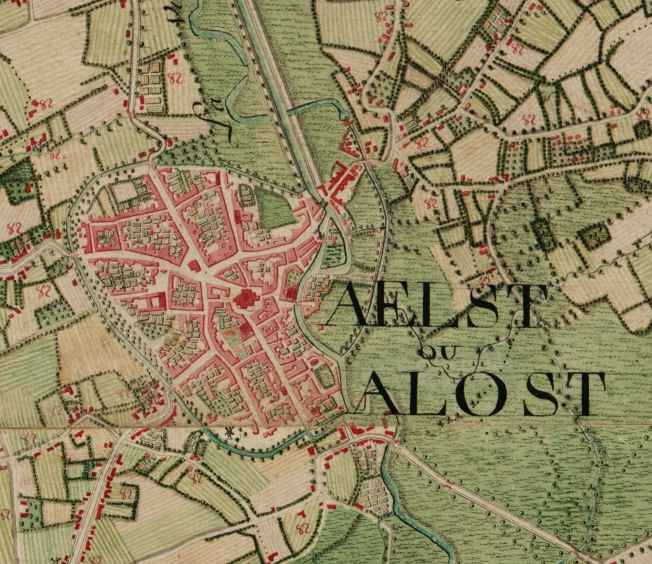
Aalst on the Ferraris map (around 1775)

The first historical records on Aalst date from the 9th century, when it was described as the villa Alost, a dependency of the Abbey of Lobbes. During the Middle Ages, a town and port grew at this strategic point, where the road from Bruges to Cologne crossed the Dender. While it was within the Holy Roman Empire it was considered the capital of the province of Flanders. In 1046, Aalst was transferred to the Countship of Imperial Flanders, and absorbed a portion of Brabant, and in 1173 it was united with the remainder of the Flanders province. Its frontier position on the border of the Holy Roman Empire allowed the town to keep a certain degree of independence. Its relation with Brabant has been preserved in the city's white and red coat of arms, the colours of Lotharingia.

Construction of the town hall began in the middle of the 12th century, making it the oldest surviving town hall in Belgium. Several manuscripts from this period still survive in the town archives. During the Hundred Years War the town of Aalst allied themselves with Louis de Male against Philip van Artevelde and sent troops in the victorious Battle of Roosebeke. The town hall, and the city itself, were almost entirely destroyed by fire in 1360. The town was soon rebuilt and a new belfry in gothic style was built in the 15th century. This was a time of great prosperity for the city, dominated by the powerful weavers' guild. It is also at that time that Dirk Martens, a local citizen, became the Southern Netherlands’ first printer, founding a printing shop in 1473 that published books by various authors including Christopher Columbus; Martens would later become a professor at the Old University of Leuven, and he was laid to rest in the St Martin's Church of Aalst.

Aalst suffered considerably under the Eighty Years' War (1568–1648). It was later taken by the French Marshal Turenne in the War of Devolution of 1667, then occupied by France until 1706, when it became independent once more following the Battle of Ramillies, along with Southern Flanders in general. The textile-based economy flourished under the French. In the 18th century, the Austrians controlled the region. 1830 saw Belgium gain independence and Aalst became part of the country, this ended a long period, starting in 1056, of foreign control, by such as the Spanish, German, French, and the Dutch. The 19th century was marked by social crises engendered by the Industrial Revolution, with Father Adolf Daens and his Christene Volkspartij emerging as the local defender of workers' rights. This was in response to Rerum novarum, which established worker rights. However Daens felt this did not do enough. Eventually, he was made to pay for his "splinter movement". In the Pre-World War II years, the fascist movement in the Low Countries gained momentum, with the collaborationist Vlaamsch Nationaal Verbond (Flemish National Union) putting down roots in the region. Aalst, along with Brussels and Antwerp were the strongest subscribers to this line of thought. The 20th century was marked by bombardment and occupation by the Germans during both world wars.

== Economy ==
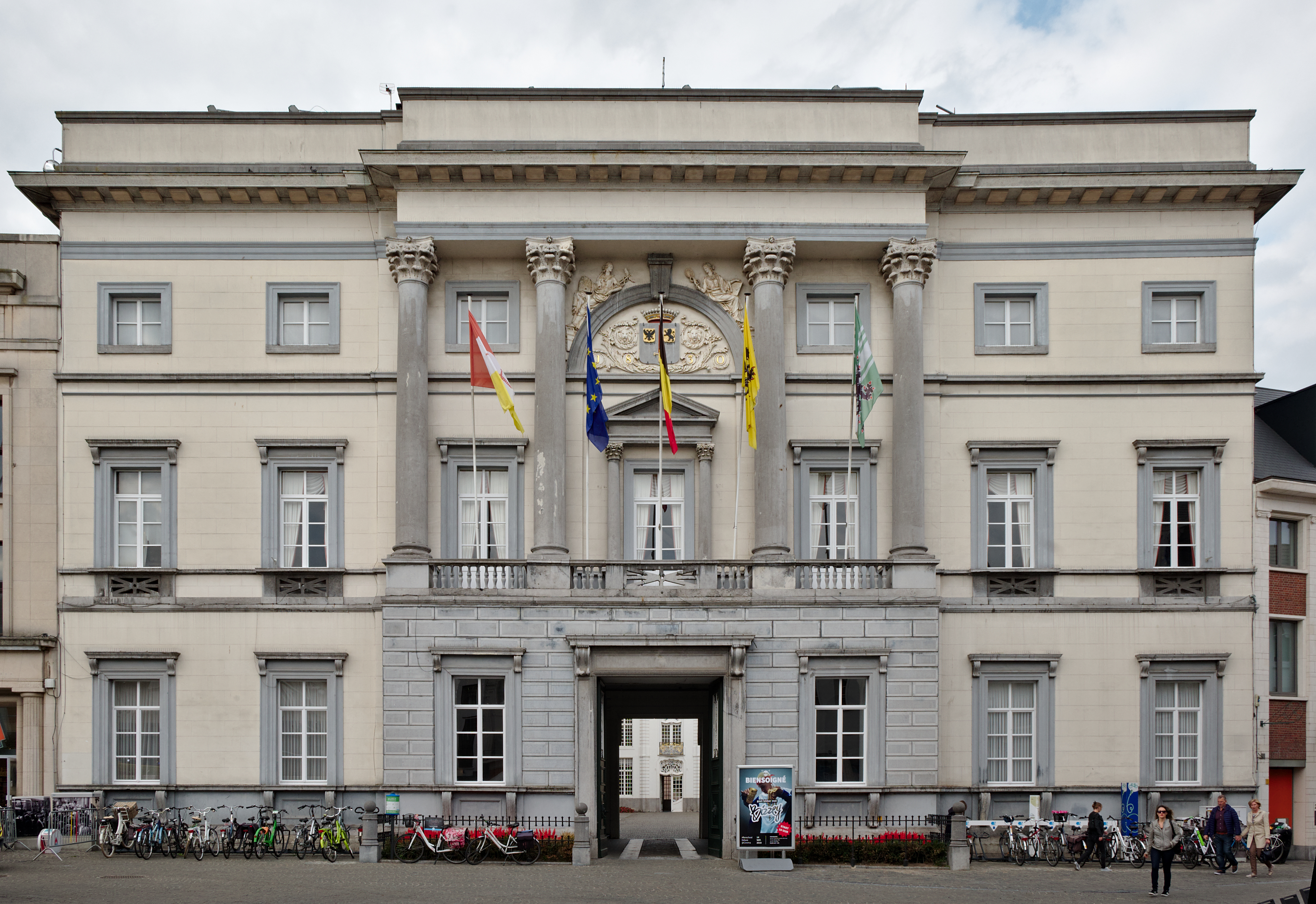
Aalst City Hall

The textile industry is still vibrant in Aalst, in part because of the French occupation. Aalst produces not only the textiles themselves, clothing and footwear, but manufactures many of the needed machines. The more rural regions are noted for their production of hops, which are sold to the old breweries there. They also have a large active cut flower business in the region.

== Carnival ==
Aalst is known for its carnival festivities, celebrated every year before Lent. During this celebration, the former town hall belfry is the site of the traditional "throwing of the onions". A Prince Carnival is elected, who is allowed to "rule" the city for three days. A big parade crosses the city on Sunday, with about 70 groups of costumed volunteers and parade cars. Carnival Tuesday or Shrove Tuesday (by tradition, the day before Ash Wednesday), is known as the day of the 'Voil Jeannetten' (literally: "the Dirty Jennies"), i.e., men dressed as women. The festivities traditionally end with the "Burning of the Doll", happening on Tuesday evening. In recent years the carnival has been accused of antisemitism due to the repeated use of derogatory imagery against Jews.

=== Controversy ===
In December 2019, anticipating UNESCO's response to the decision of the carnival organizers to double down on the widely reported use of antisemitic stereotypes, the mayor of Aalst pre-emptively applied to have his city's carnival removed from the Representative List of the Intangible Cultural Heritage of Humanity. This is the only time such a request has been made.

In 2020 the Aalst parade included more antisemitic costumes. These included floats depicting Orthodox Jews with hooked noses standing on sacks of gold coins. Israel's ambassador to Belgium stated "What we are asking for is the prohibition of all these antisemitic cartoons, which are beyond good taste, which have nothing to do with a sense of humor and which do not honor an exemplary democracy such as Belgium." In response, Belgium's prime minister, Sophie Wilmès, described the parade as an "internal affair." UNIA, the Interfederal Centre for Equal Opportunities and Opposition to Racism, stated in a report that no criminal offences were committed, for the parade had no antisemitic motive, nor the intent to incite hatred or violence against Jews.

== In the media ==
The Belgian TV police drama, 13 Geboden (13 Commandments) was filmed in Aalst.

The Belgian historical drama Thieves of the Wood is set in and around Aalst.

The 1992 movie Daens, about Adolf Daens and directed by Stijn Coninx, is set in Aalst. Coninx also filmed the Aalst-set 2018 movie Niet Schieten (based on the last attributed crime of the Brabant killers, committed in Aalst in 1985) in Aalst.

== Sites of interest ==
- The 15th-century Belfry of Aalst next to the town hall contains a 52-bell carillon, the oldest in Belgium. Together with the adjacent Aldermen's House, it was classified by UNESCO as a World Heritage Site in 1999 (part of Belfries of Belgium and France).
- The famous "unfinished" St. Martin's Collegiate Church, in Gothic style, dates back to 1480. It contains a painting by Rubens, Saint Roch beseeching Christ to terminate the Plague at Aalst, and it also has a tabernacle (dated 1605), which features sculptures made by Hiëronymus Duquesnoy the Elder, whose most famous creation is Manneken Pis. This church was damaged in 1914.
- The statue of Dirk Martens (1450–1534), first printer in the Netherlands.
- The old breweries that grow their own hops.
- The Town square has a gallery with a second statue of Martens along with Charles V.
- The city's park.
- The 19th century Neo-Gothic church Saint-Joseph.
- The 19th century Onze-Lieve-Vrouw van Meuleschettekapel.
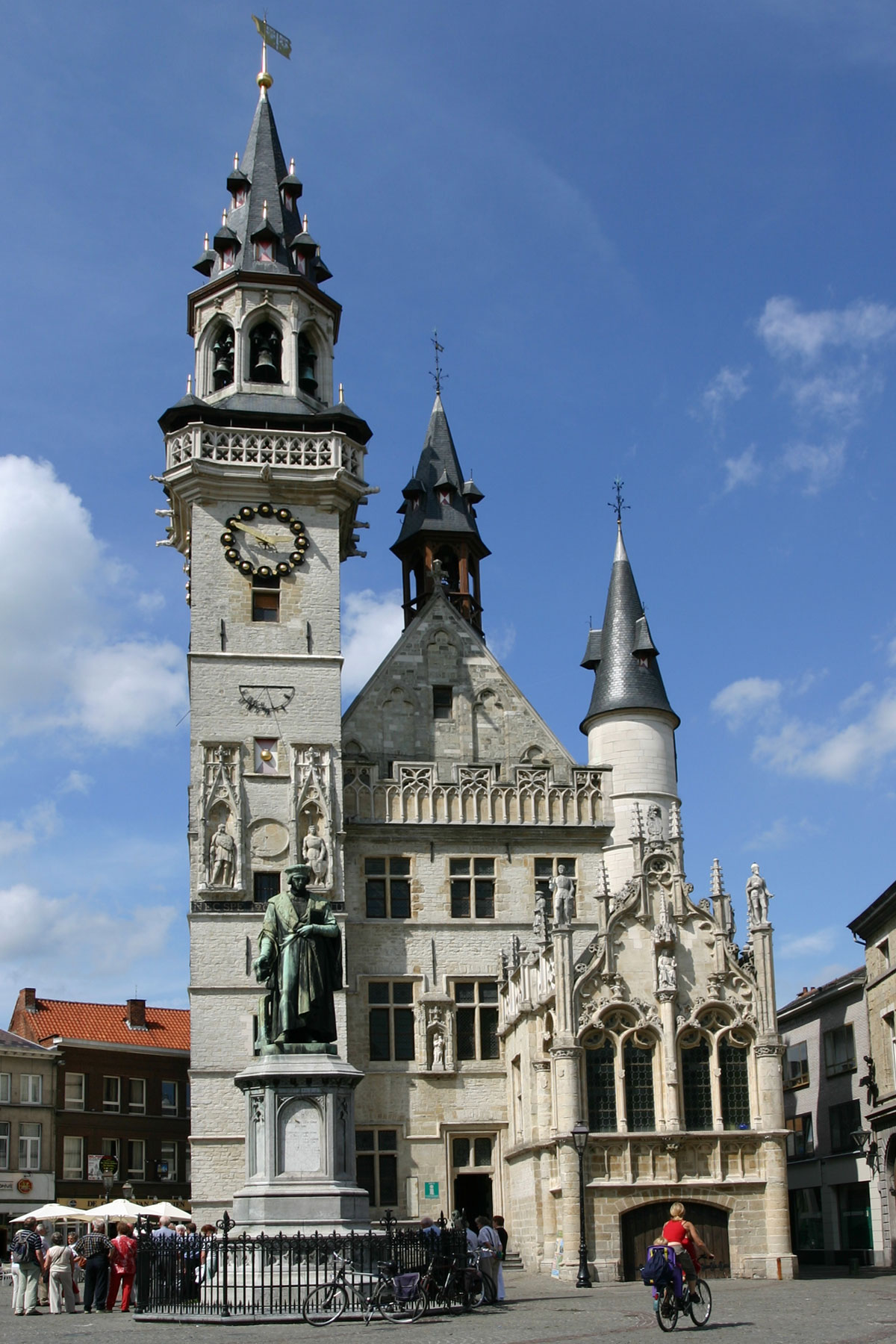
Belfry of Aalst

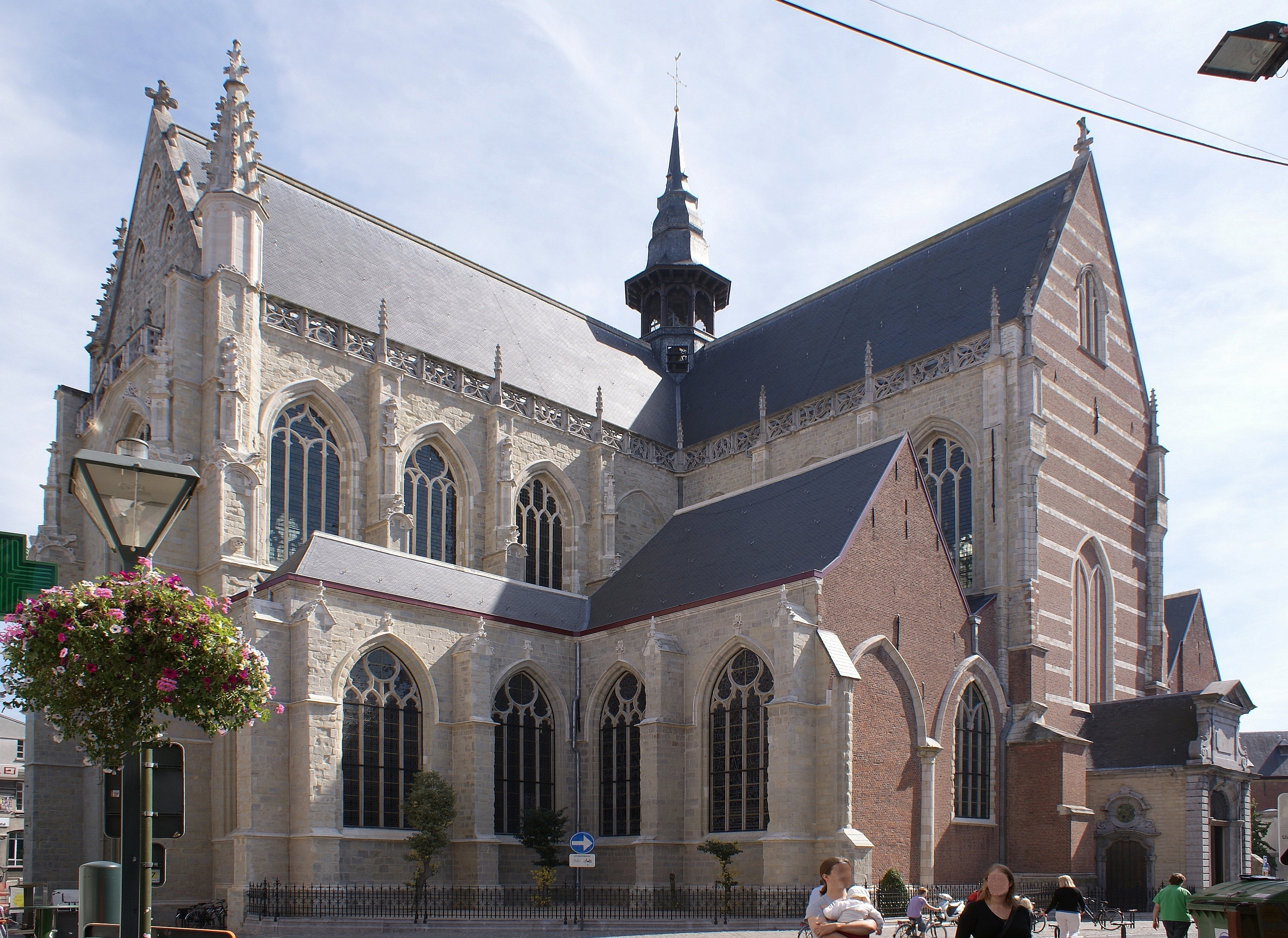
Saint Martin's Church

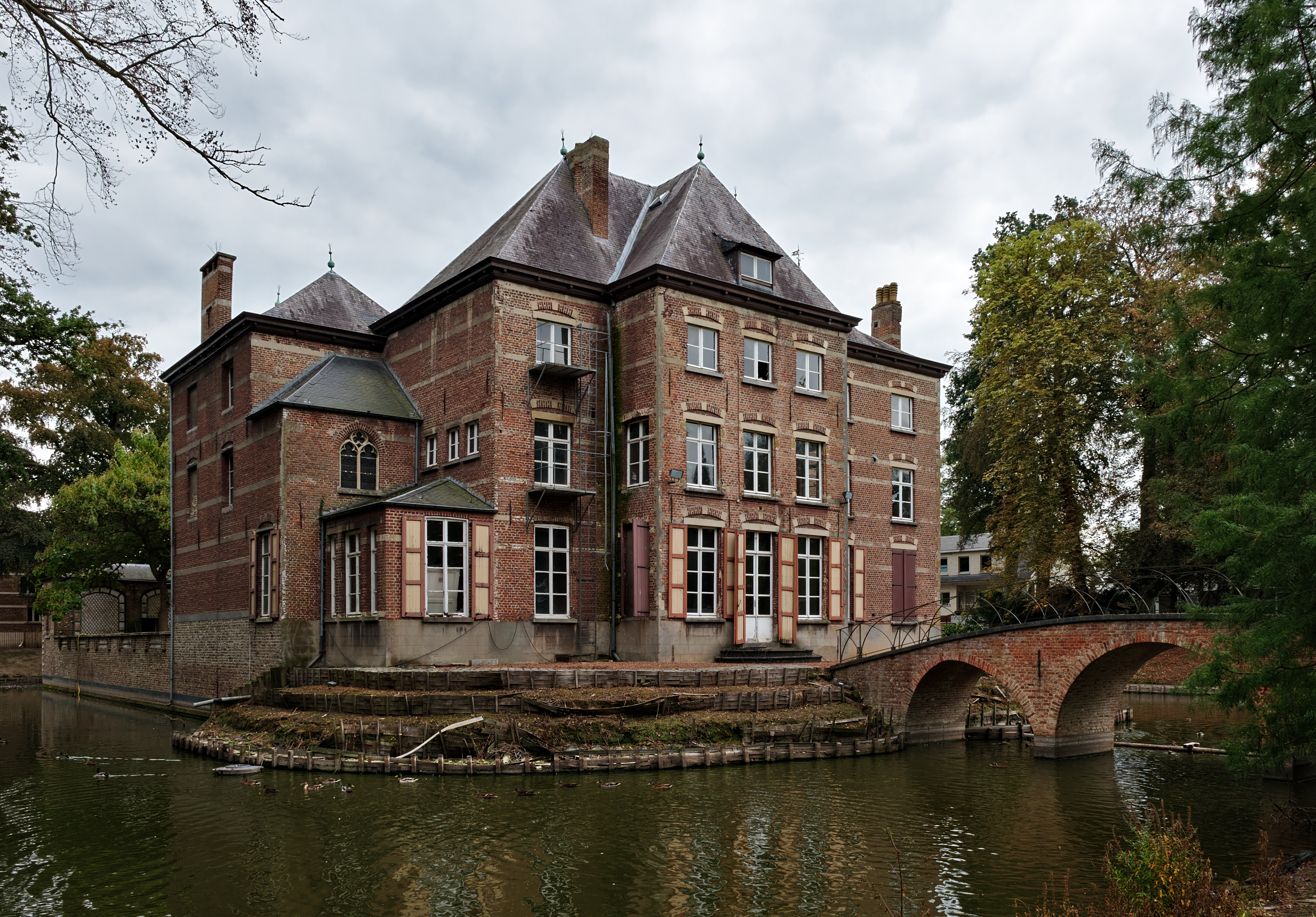
Terlinden castle

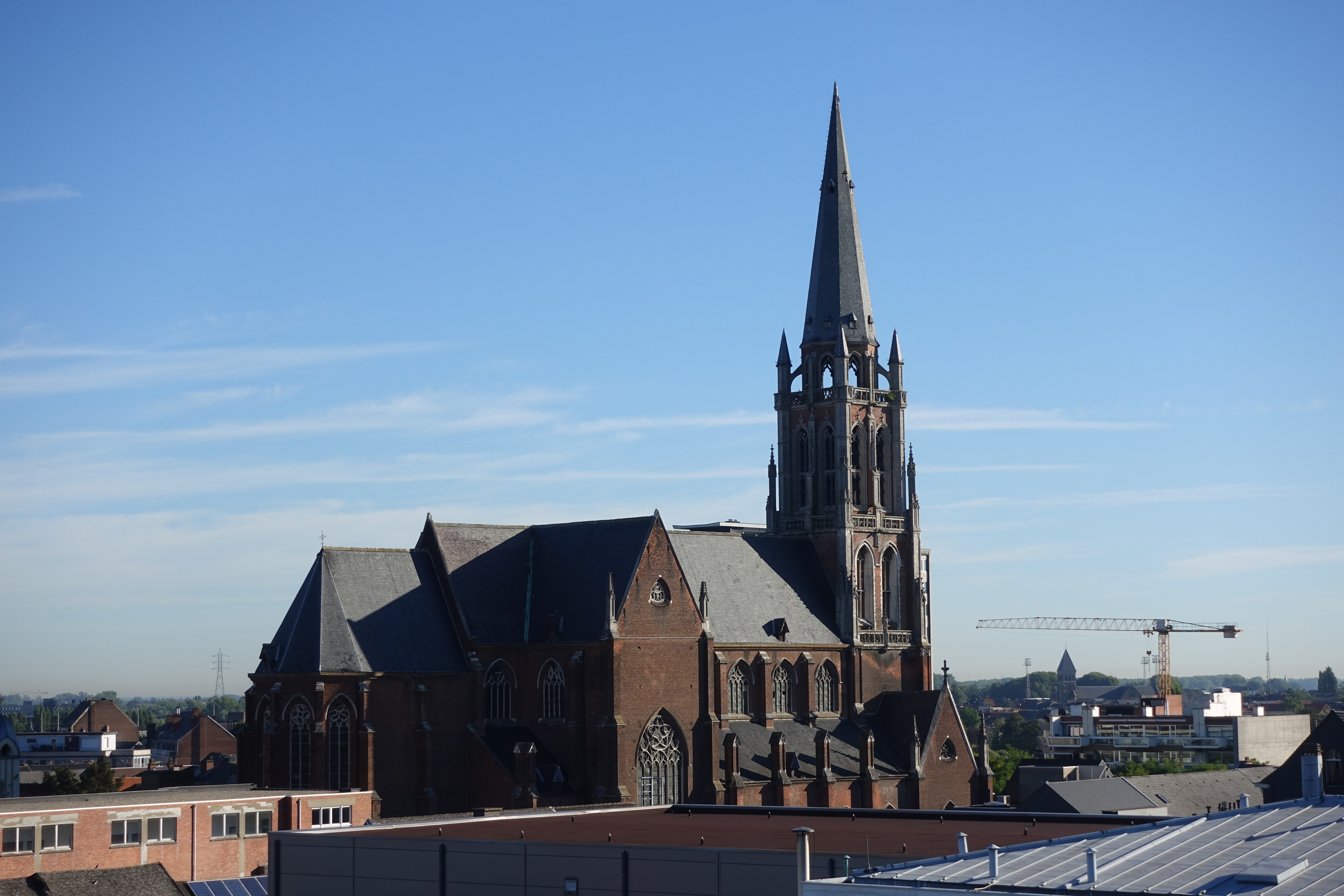
Saint-Joseph Church (Aalst)

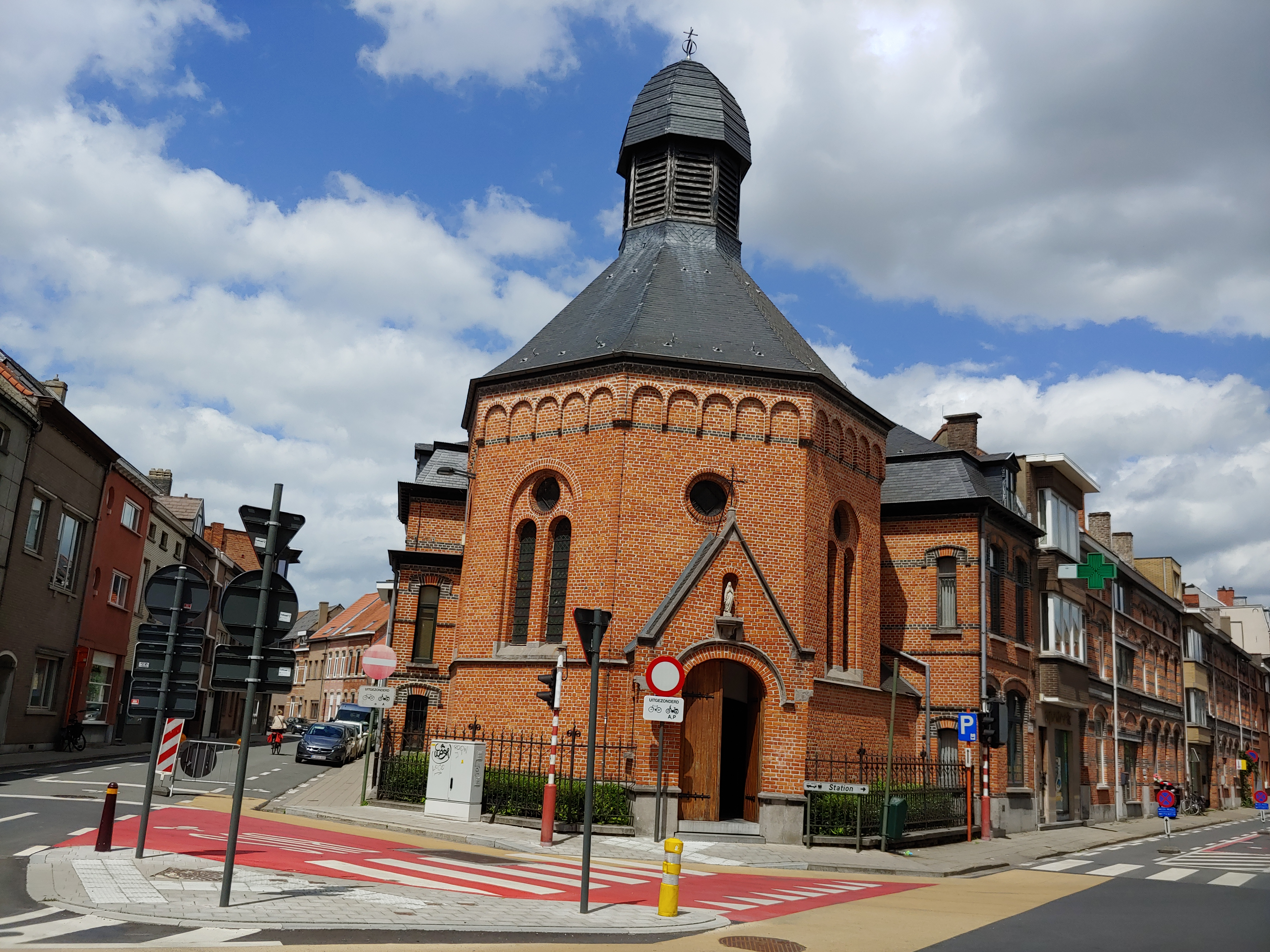
Onze-Lieve-Vrouw van Meuleschettekapel

== Notable inhabitants ==
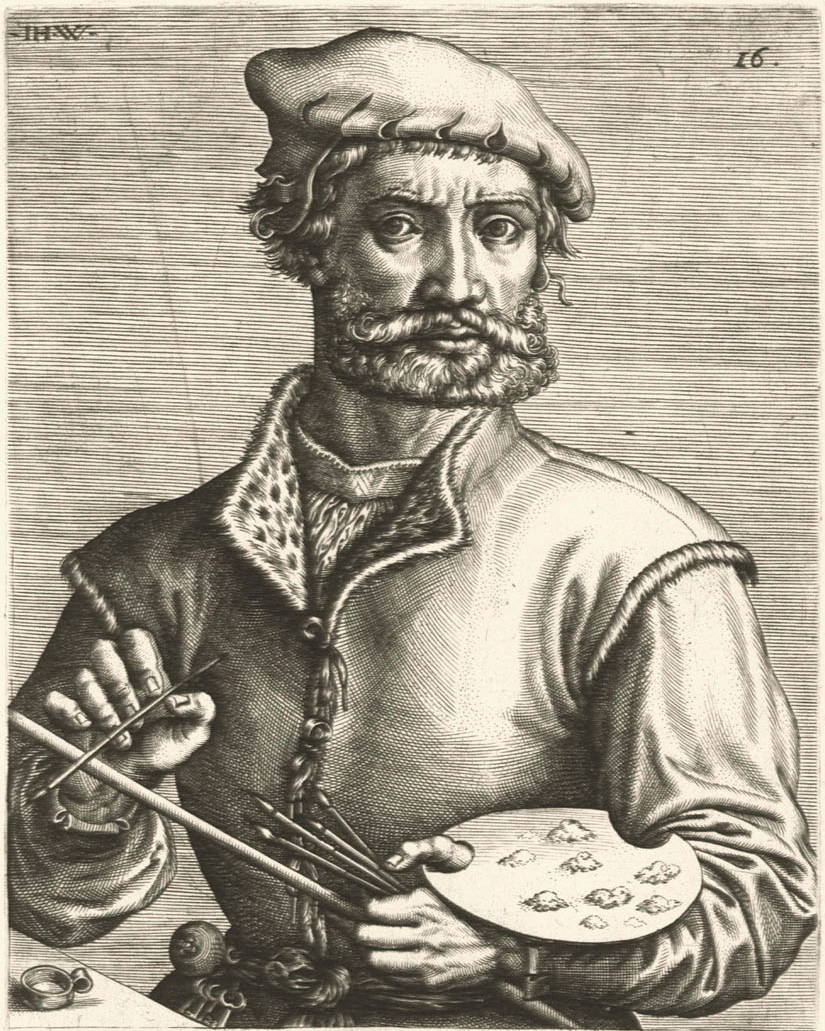
Johannes Wierix – Portrait of Pieter Coecke van Aelst

- Jo Bogaert (born 1956), Belgian new beat DJ
- Louis Paul Boon (1912–1979), writer and journalist
- Franz Cumont (1868–1947), archeologist, historian, and philologist
- Adolf Daens (1839–1907), priest and politician
- Mark De Bie (born 1939), television writer
- Pieter De Bruyne (1931–1987), designer and interior architect
- Valerius De Saedeleer (1867–1941), painter
- Geert De Vlieger (born 1971), football goalkeeper
- Louis D'Haeseleer (1911–1988), politician
- Remco Evenepoel (born 2000), professional cyclist
- Bert Kruismans, (born 1966), stand-up comedian
- Herman Le Compte (1929–2008), physician, gerontologist
- Bernard Le Grelle (born 1948), investigative journalist, political adviser, author
- Luc Luycx (born 1958), designer of the common side of the euro coins
- Dirk Martens (c. 1446 – 1534), the first book printer in the Southern Netherlands
- Monika Triest (born 1941) founder of women's studies programs at the University of Cincinnati and University of Amsterdam
- Ilse Uyttersprot (1967–2020), mayor of Aalst
- Pieter Coecke van Aelst (1502–1550), painter, sculptor and architect
- Luc Van den Bossche (born 1947), socialist politician
- Peter Van Der Heyden (born 1976), Belgian and international footballer
- Patrick Van Goethem (born 1969), countertenor
- Gonda Van Steen (born 1964), classical scholar
- Dimitri Verhulst (born 1972), writer and poet
- Sébastien Verhulst (1907–1944), Belgian international footballer
- Wilfried Wesemael (born 1950), cyclist

== Transport ==
- Aalst railway station
- Aalst Kerrebroek railway station
- Erembodegem railway station

== Symbols ==
=== Flag ===
Description: A rectangle of proportions 2:3, with three vertical bands of red, white and yellow, with a red sword in the middle band pointing upwards. In Dutch: "Drie even lange banen van rood, van wit en van geel, met op het wit een rood zwaard paalsgewijze geplaatst."

Heraldic blazon: Terciated by pale Gules, Argent and Or, a sword of the first pointing upwards.

=== Coat of arms ===
Those arms were granted in 1819 and confirmed on 6 February 1841. The oldest known seals of Aalst (13th–14th centuries) show a knight holding a sword in one hand and the Flemish banner in the other, but there is a seal dated 1237 showing the banner with the sword, and even an older seal, dated 1174, with the same features. A later version of the seal (1339–1559) shows a local banner with the sword. A seal from 1407 adds a small shield with the Flemish arms.

The arms of Aalst were first shown in the roll of arms of Gaillard (1557). The sword is probably taken from the old seal with the knight. The two shields show the Imperial eagle and the Flemish lion, recalling the odd status of the Country of Aalst.

Description: The municipal arms of Aalst show on the chief of a white shield two smaller shields separated by a red sword pointing upwards and dividing the whole shield; on dexter, the shield is yellow with a black double-headed eagle with red tongues and claws (Holy Roman Empire); on sinister, the shield is yellow with a black lion with a red tongue and claws (Flanders).

Heraldic blazon: A Modern French shield Argent ensigned by a crown Or and divided in half by a sword palewise pointing upwards Gules between two smaller shields Or; on the dexter shield, a double-headed eagle displayed; on the sinister shield a lion rampant; both Sable armed and langued Gules.

== Sport ==
Aalst has several professional teams:

- The basketball club Okapi Aalstar
- The football club Eendracht Aalst who play in the second division.
- The volleyball club VK Aalst, which was founded in the 1960s, playing in the first division.
- The MotoGP team Repsol Honda are based in Aalst, Belgium.

== Twin city ==
- Worcester, South Africa
- Gabrovo, Bulgaria
