= Mark De Bie =

Belgian television writer

Mark De Bie (born 5 February 1939 in Aalst - Baardegem, Belgium) is a retired Belgian television writer.

He has written Belgian TV series such as Alfa Papa Tango in 1990 which he co-wrote with Guy Bernaert.

He is also credited with acting in the TV series De Paradijsvogels in 1979, portraying a doctor.

== Bibliography ==
- Een koningsjaar (1992)
- Cinema Jarofka (1995)

== Television filmography ==
- Alfa Papa Tango (1990) TV Series (writer)
- De Paradijsvogels (1979) TV Series (screenplay)
- De dag dat het kampioenschap van België verreden werd (1978) (TV)
