= Herman Le Compte =

- Born: 26 April 1929
- Died: 3 January 2008 (aged 78)
- Other names: Vitamin Doctor
- Occupations: Physician and Gerontologist

Herman Le Compte (26 April 1929 in Aalst – 3 January 2008 in Knokke) was a Belgian physician and gerontologist.

== Biography ==
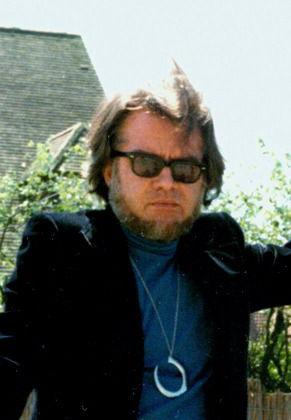
Herman Le Compte

Known across his native Flanders as the "Vitamin Doctor," Le Compte became famous during the 1960s with a series of books and TV shows dedicated to health and aging. He claimed that vitamins and yeast would increase longevity, and called for elders taking a more active role in society. His claims led to a lifelong ban by the Belgian medical association.

Despite the ban, he continued to practise medicine leading to his arrest. After a two-decade legal fight he was vindicated by the ECHR and legally allowed to practise again.

Le Compte died in his sleep of a heart attack on 3 January 2008 in Knokke, Belgium.

== Bibliography ==
- Herman Le Compte: Qui Encore a Peur de Moi? Le Credo du Herman Le Compte., Banana Press 1973
- Herman Le Compte: Het is niet nodig gek te zijn, maar het kan helpen, Gottmer 1974, ISBN 90-257-0237-6
- Herman Le Compte: Wir Kinder des Methusalem: Alters-Chancen der jungen Gesellschaft, Econ-Verlag 1978, ISBN 3-430-15908-3, ab 1980 als Lizenzausgabe bei Droemer-Knaur, ISBN 3-426-03634-7
- Herman Le Compte, Pia Pervenche: So lebt man länger nach Dr LeComptes Erfolgsmethode : vital und gesund bis ins hohe Alter, Falken-Verlag 1982, ISBN 3-8068-4129-2
