= Guy Bernaert =

Belgian television writer (1940–2017)

- Born: 17 May 1940; Antwerp, Belgium
- Died: 15 March 2017 (aged 76); Borgerhout, Belgium
- Occupation: Television writer

Guy Bernaert (17 May 1940 in Antwerp – 15 March 2017 in Borgerhout) was a Belgian television writer. He wrote several Belgian TV series, including Alfa Papa Tango in 1990 (which he co-wrote with Mark De Bie) and Thuis.

== TV filmography ==
- Windkracht 10 (1997) – TV series (writer)
- Thuis (1996–2013) – TV series (writer)
- Oog in oog (1991) – TV series (writer)
- Alfa Papa Tango (1990) – TV series (writer)
- De Kapersbrief (1989)
- Het Begeren (1988) – TV
- Langs de kade (1988) – TV series (writer)
- Het Liegebeest (1983) – TV series (writer)
