= Schepenhuis, Aalst =

Aldermen's House
- Schepenhuis (Dutch)
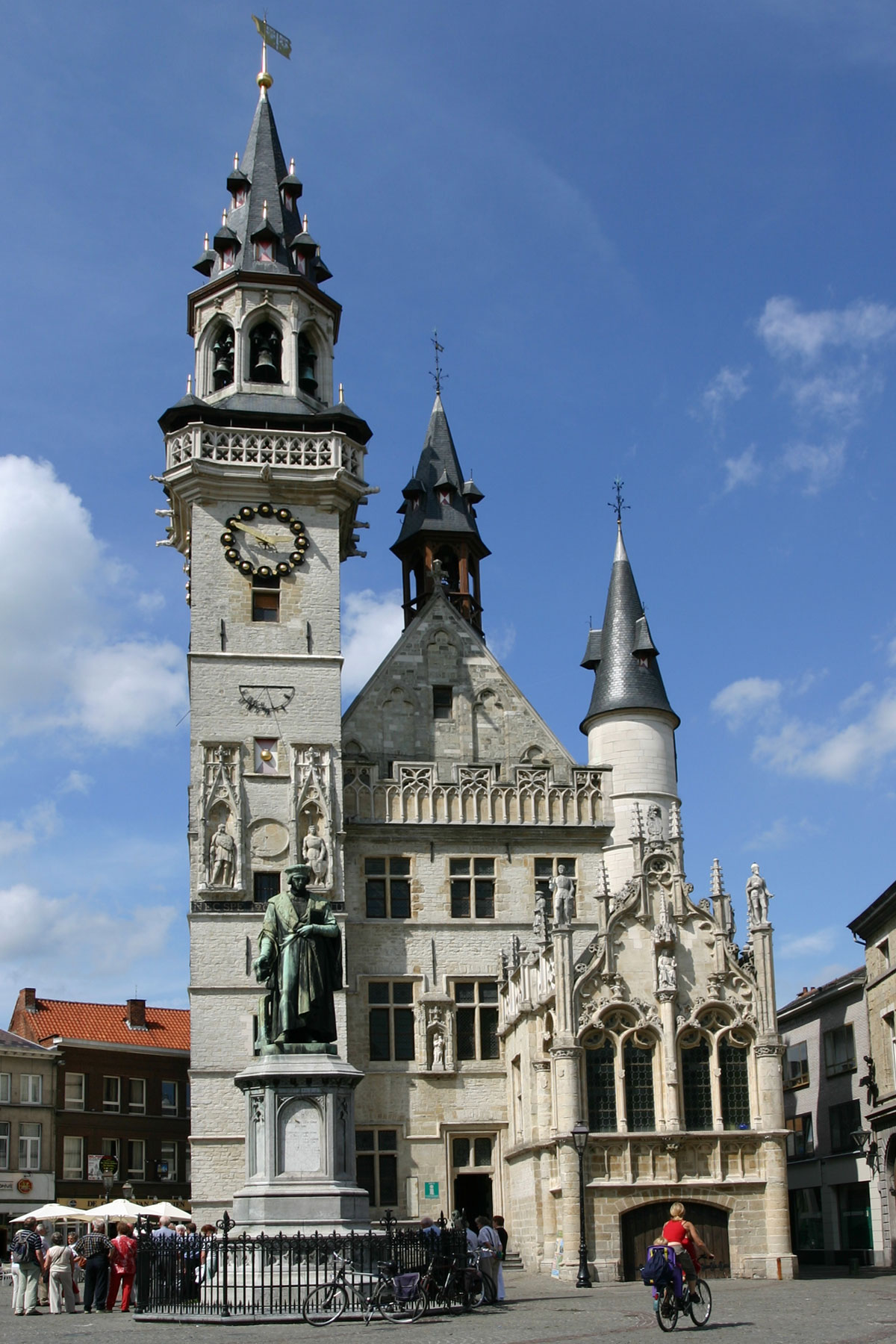
- Schepenhuis and belfry, Aalst
- Interactive map of the Aldermen's House area

General information
- Type: Town hall
- Architectural style: Gothic
- Location: Aalst, East Flanders, Belgium
- Coordinates: 50°56′18″N 4°02′20″E

The Schepenhuis (Aldermen's House) of Aalst, East Flanders, Belgium, is a former city hall, one of the oldest in the Low Countries. Dating originally from 1225, it was partially rebuilt twice as a result of fire damage, first after a 1380 war and again after a fireworks accident in 1879.

The belfry tower at one corner of the building was completed in 1460, and in the next year was equipped with a carillon built by master craftsmen from Mechelen. The current carillon, the sixth installed since the original, has 52 bells. Inscribed on the tower are the Latin words nec spe, nec metu ("not with hope, not with fear"). This was the motto of Spain's Philip II, whose domain expanded into the Low Countries in 1555.

A small wing of late Gothic style, facing the market square and adorned with five life-size statues, was added in the 16th century. From this annex one can access the cellars, which originally served as torture chambers.

The Schepenhuis with its belfry is one of an ensemble of related buildings that together have received UNESCO World Heritage status as part of the Belfries of Belgium and France site.

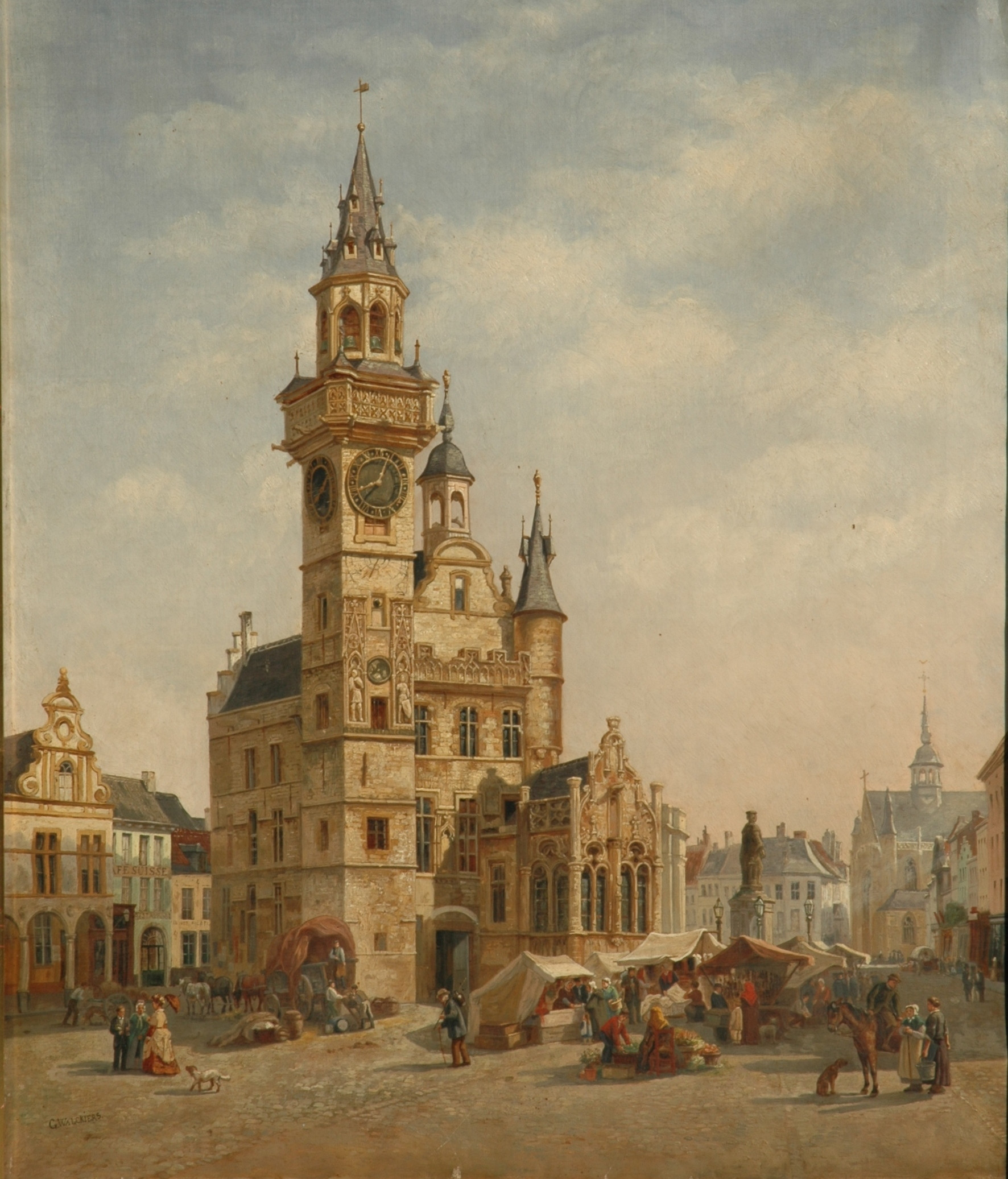
Depiction of the Schepenhuis of Aalst by Gustave Walckiers in 1880

== See also ==
- List of carillons in Belgium
