= Sébastien Verhulst =

Belgian footballer (1907–1944)

Personal information
- Date of birth: 19 February 1907
- Place of birth: Aalst, Belgium
- Date of death: 20 March 1944 (aged 37)
- Position: Forward

Senior career*
Years	Team	Apps	(Gls)
1925–1932	Beerschot	60	(14)
1932–1938	Eendracht Aalst	112	(68)

International career
1928	Belgium	1	(0)
- * Club domestic league appearances and goals

Sébastien Verhulst (19 February 1907 – 20 March 1944) was a Belgian footballer who represented his nation at the 1928 Summer Olympics in the Netherlands.
