= Bert Kruismans =

Belgian stand-up comedian (born 1966)

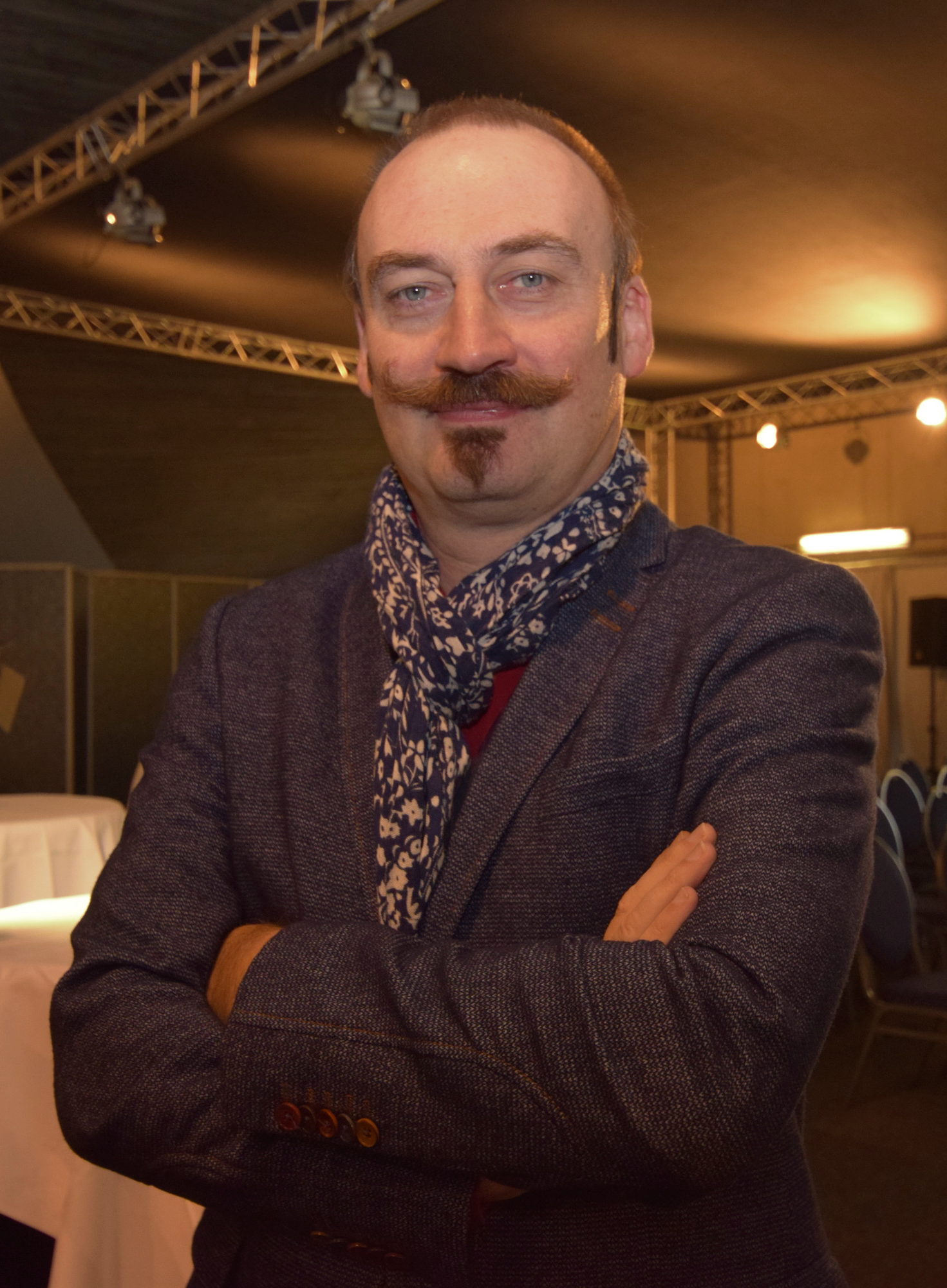
- Ahmed at the 2010 Tribeca Film Festival
- Born: 1966 (age 59–60); Sint-Katherina-Lombeek, Belgium

Comedy career
- Medium: Stand-up
- Genres: Observational comedy, Satire
- Subject: Daily life
- Website: www.bertkruismans.be

Bert Kruismans (1966) is a Belgian stand-up comedian. He is best known for his part as a judge in the Flemish television series De Rechtvaardige Rechters and for winning the final round of the popular Belgian television quiz De Slimste Mens ter Wereld (The Smartest Person of the World).

== Early life ==
Kruismans was born in 1966 in the village of Sint-Katharine-Lombeek as Bert Hilda Van der Cruyssen and now lives in Meldert (East Flanders), near Aalst.

== Career ==
Bert Kruismans started his career as an editor and presenter on Studio Brussel, after which he moved to other Flemish radio stations like Radio Donna and the BRT-night radio.

His took his first steps on national TV by writing or editing programs like Kriebels (VTM), Now or Never (VT4), Rosa (TV1), Ombudsjan (TV1), Raar Maar Waar (VTM) and De Mannen van de Macht (Canvas).

His first real national fame followed his role as a judge on the satirical program De Rechtvaardige Rechters in which he and three fellow comedians delivered humorous commentaries for recent newspaper articles or television fragments. His moustache also became his trademark feature during the show, with many comments referring to it thanks to its rather uncommon size and form.
