= Onze-Lieve-Vrouw van Meuleschettekapel =

- Onze-Lieve-Vrouw van Meuleschettekapel
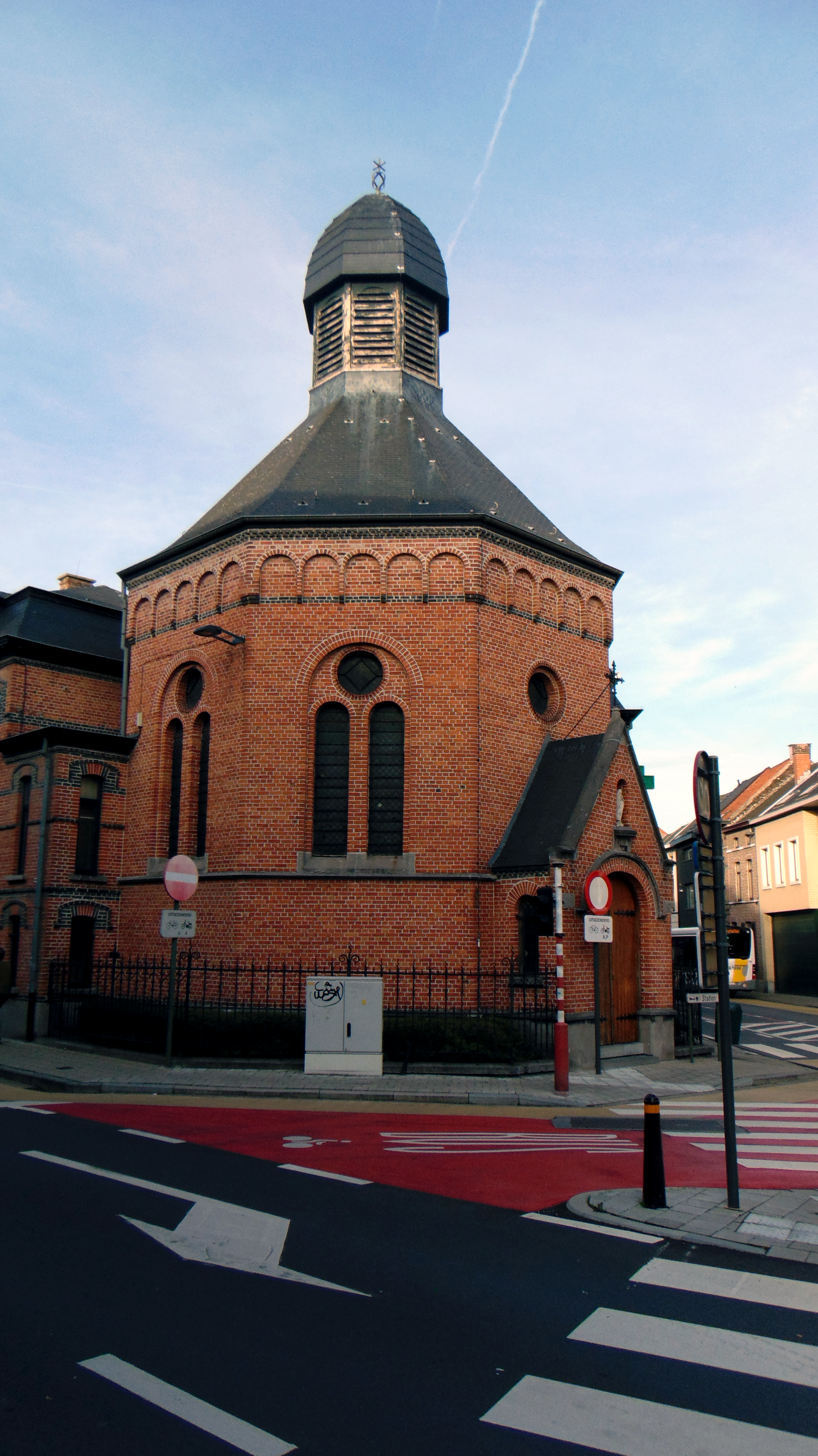
- Interactive map of the Onze-Lieve-Vrouw van Meuleschettekapel area

General information
- Type: Chapel
- Location: Aalst, East-Flanders, Belgium
- Coordinates: 50°56′27″N 4°01′52″E

Onze-Lieve-Vrouw van Meuleschettekapel, also known as The Meuleschettekapel, is a chapel in the Dirk Martensstraat in Aalst, Belgium. It was designed by Jules Goethals in 1894.

== History ==
There was once another chapel in front of the current chapel. This was first built in 1668 but was demolished in 1697. Previously (possibly) the Chapel of Our Lady ten Riemen was located; these belonging to the Catharinists. The current chapel was built in 1894, to a design by Jules Goethals. The chapel has a surrounding garden with a cast iron fence.

The name Meuleschette (in Molenschette) dates back to 1313, and refers to a water mill on the Siesegembeek.

Since 14 September 2009, the chapel has been regarded as immovable heritage of Flanders.

== Gallery ==
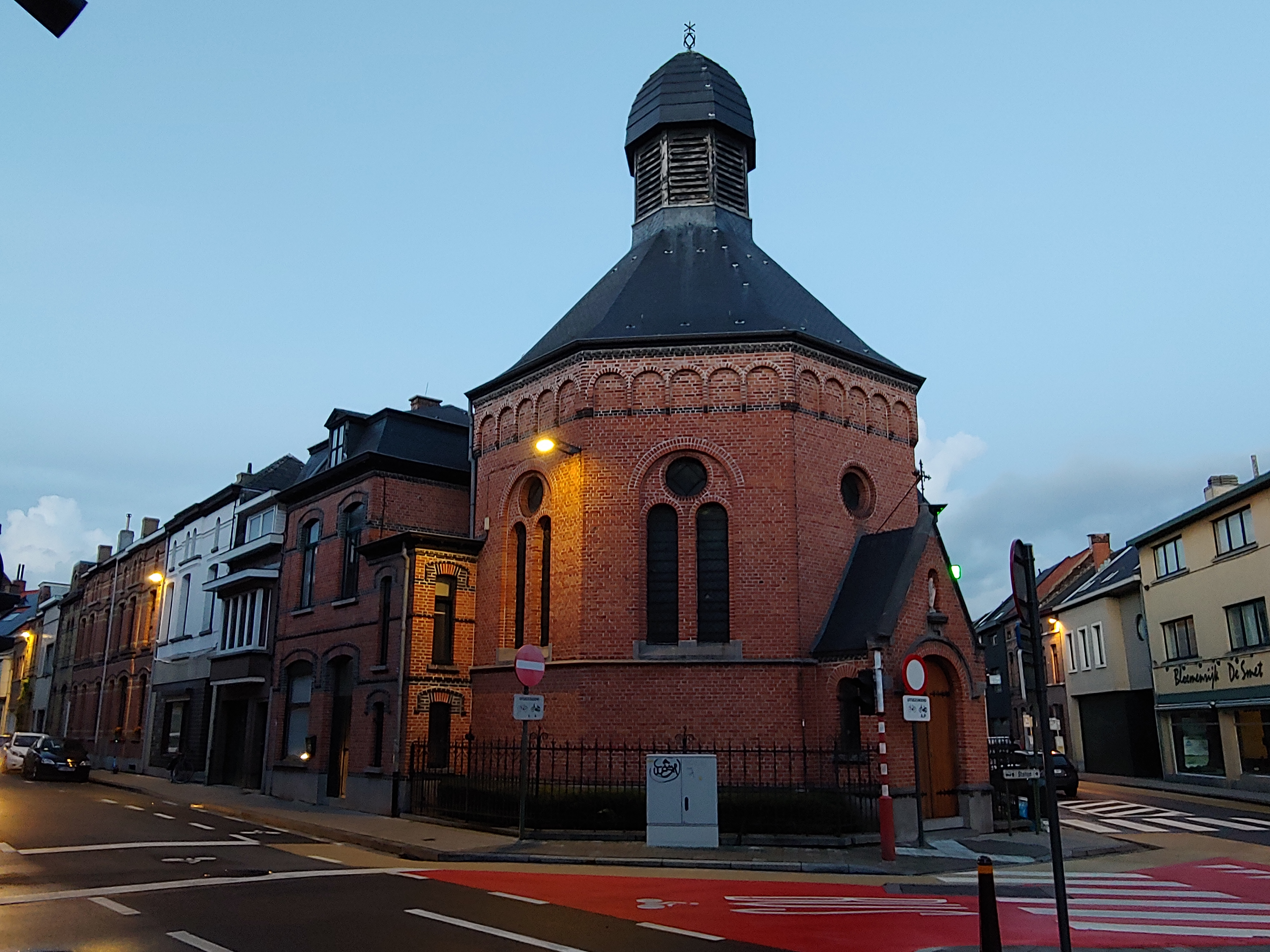
At night.

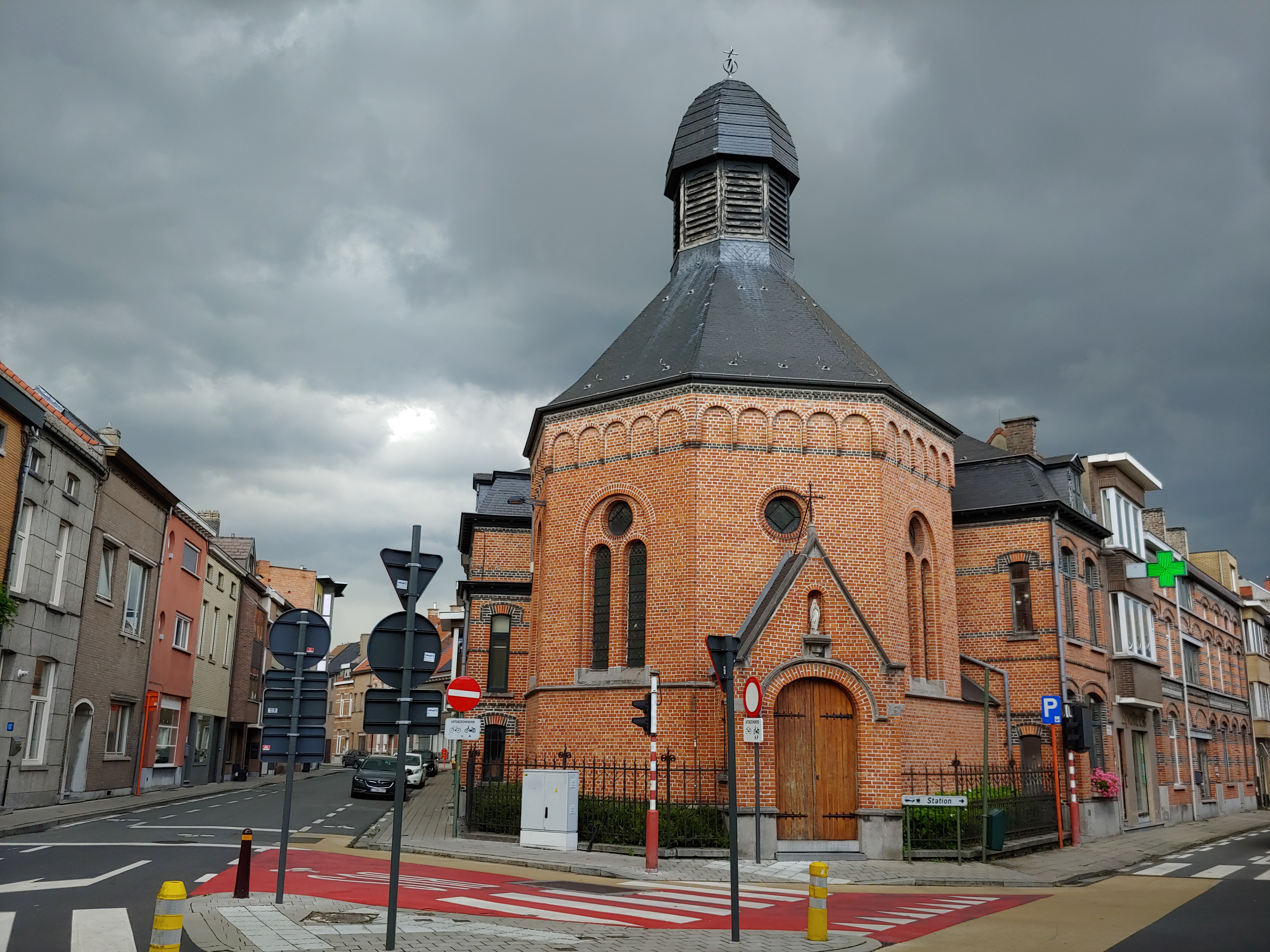
24 July 2023
