= St. Joseph's Church, Aalst =

Church in Belgium

Coordinates: 50.9411°N 4.0352°E

St. Joseph's Church
- Sint-Jozefkerk
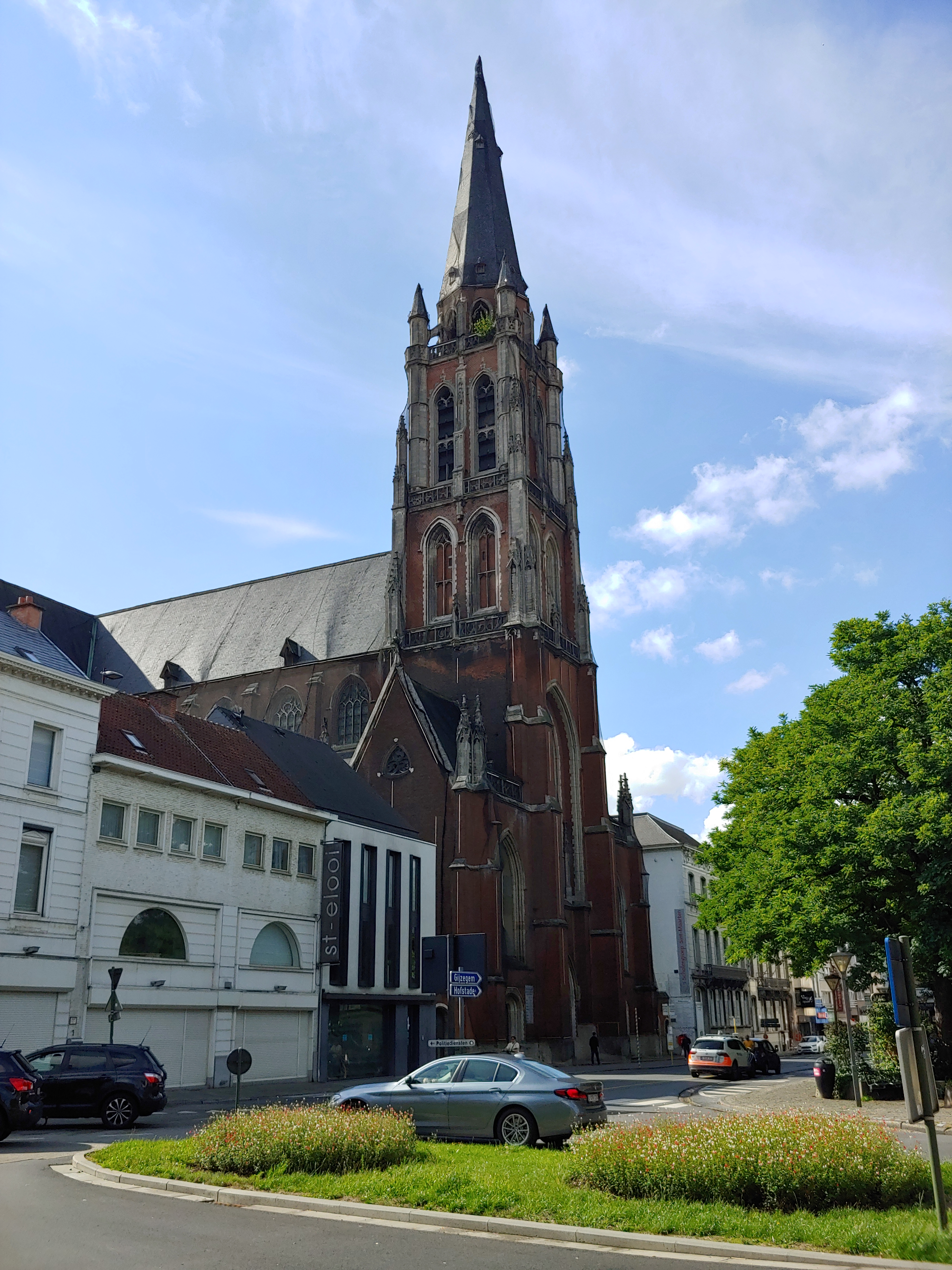

Religion
- Affiliation: Catholicism

Location
- Location: Aalst, Belgium
- Interactive map of St. Joseph's Church

Architecture
- Completed: 1908

St. Joseph's Church (Dutch: Sint-Jozefkerk) is a neo-Gothic church with basilical construction, located in Aalst, East Flanders, Belgium. Work on the church started in 1868 and was completed in 1908. It is the tallest building in Aalst (91 m).

== History ==
The parish church was built for the new neighbourhood on the Esplanadeplein, which was then located on the border of the city centre. The foundation stone was laid in 1868, and in 1873 the church was recognised as an additional parish church. The preliminary design was made by Joostens, his design was adapted and executed by Modeste de Noyette.

The future of the church is uncertain due to serious stability problems. The church has been in a bad state for several years and has not been actively used since a few years after 2014. In this period, a new interpretation of the church was already being considered. However, in 2023, it was decided to restore the building. The restoration will cost €36 million and will be subsidised by the Flemish government.

== Organ ==
Inside the church is an original organ made by the Vereecken brothers and Remi Rooms, built in the year 1900. Which has been protected since 1974.

== Gallery ==
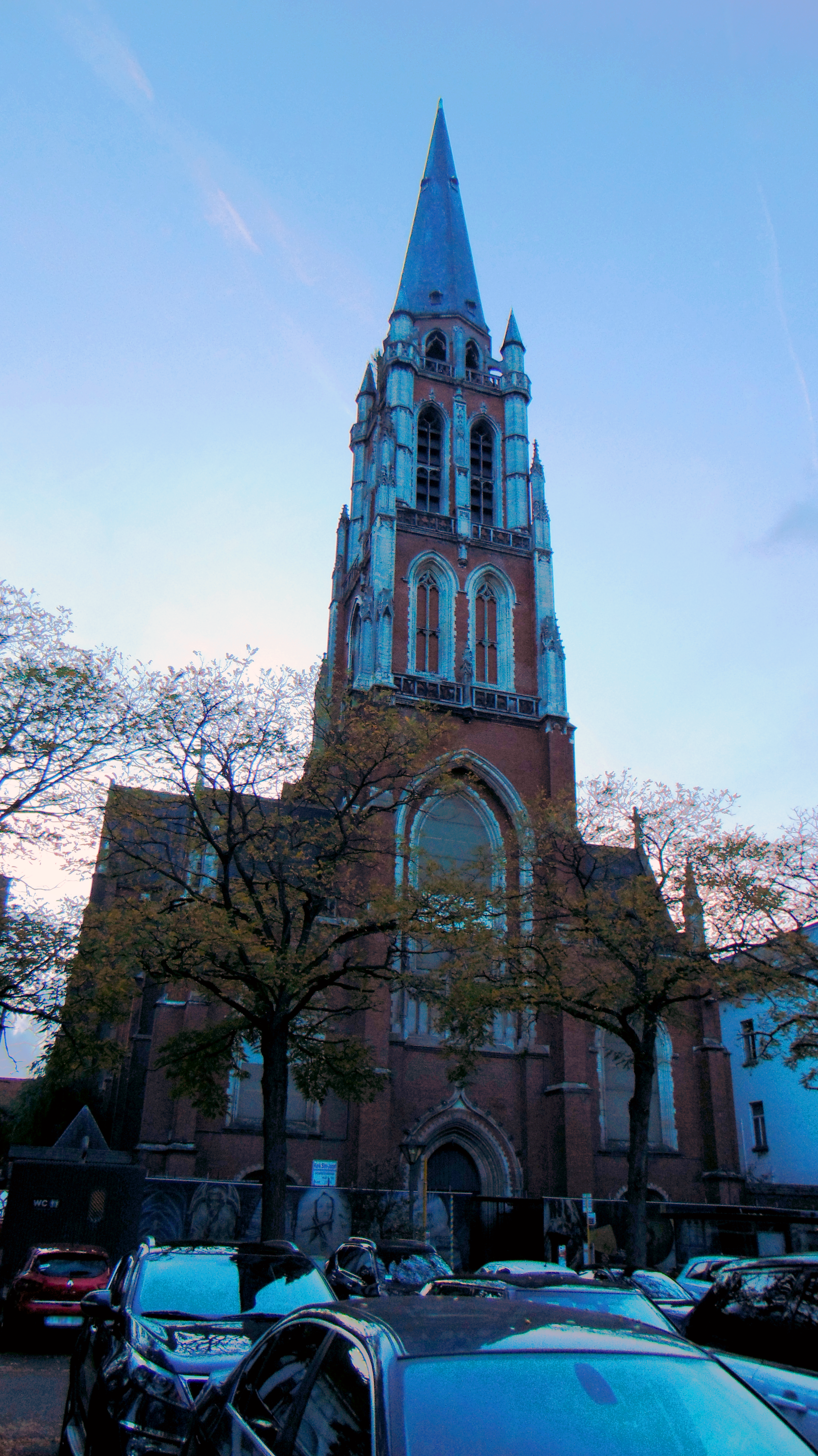
Frontal view

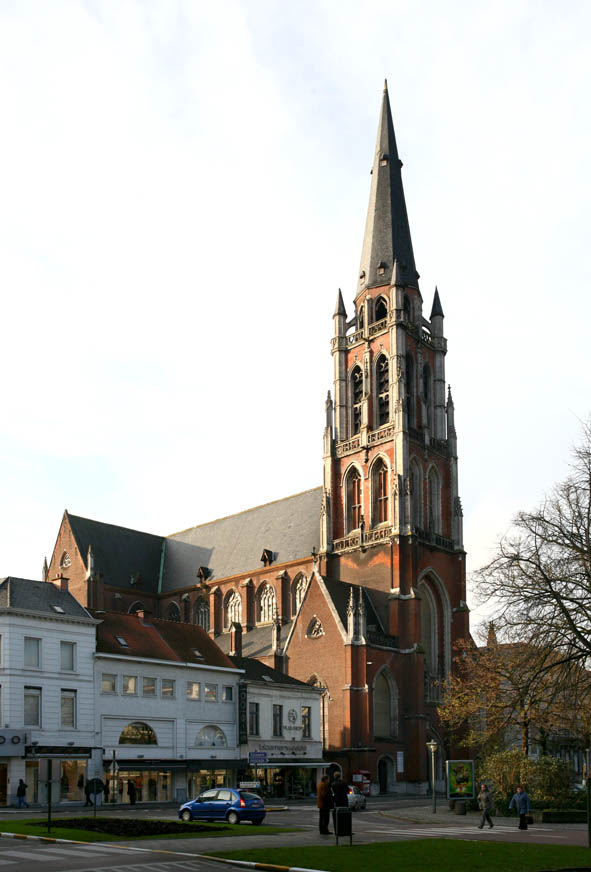
Lateral view

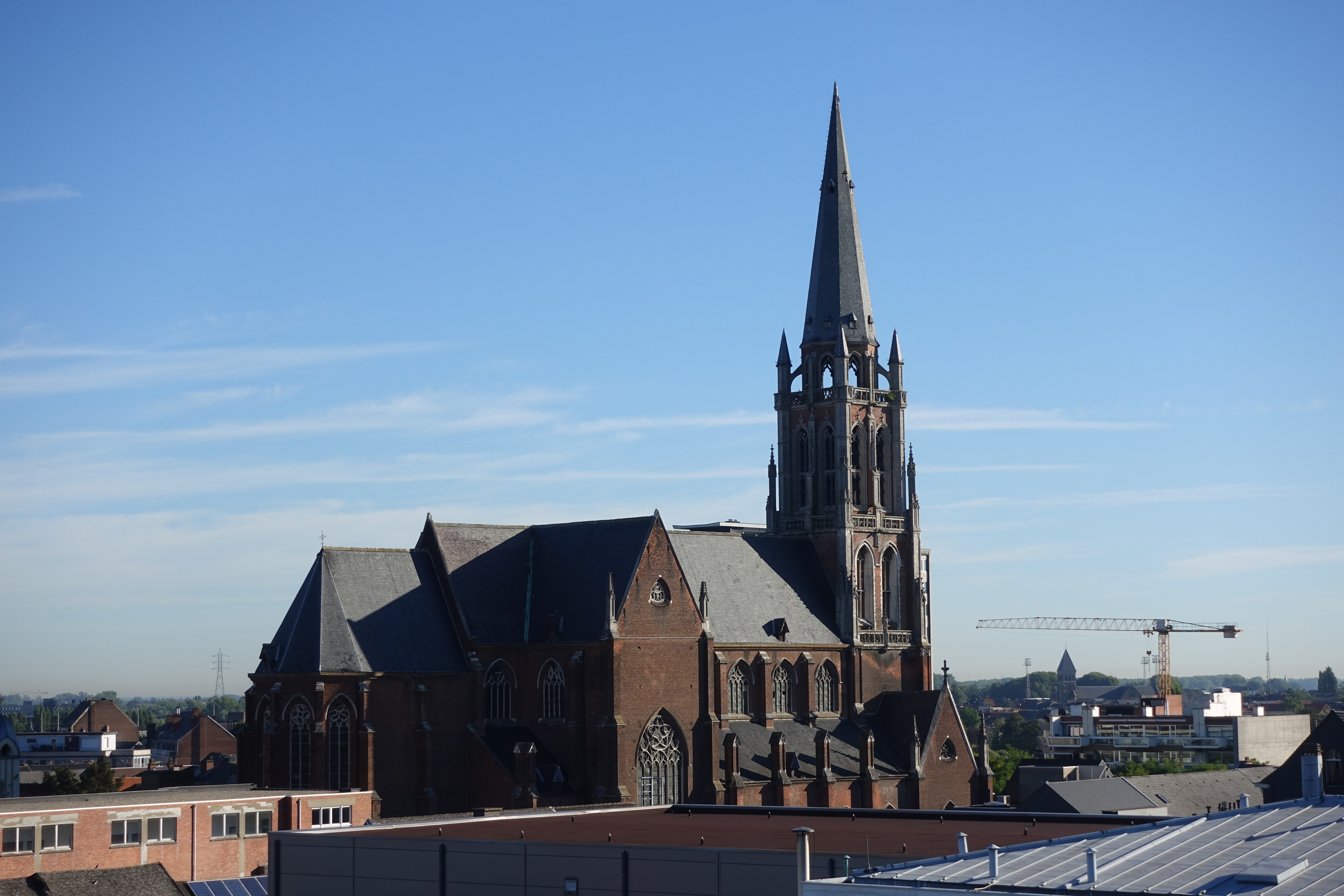
Rear view

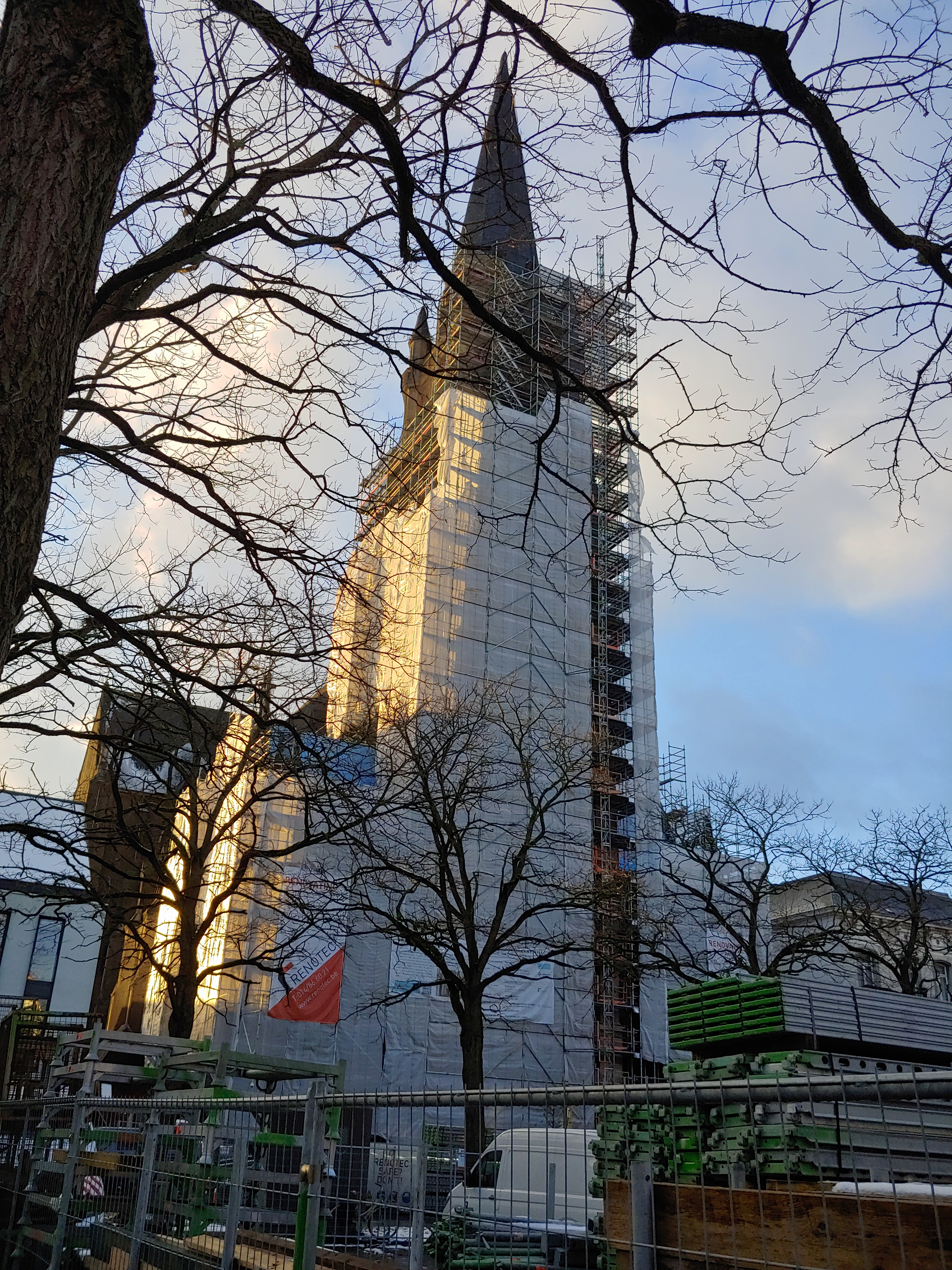
Works on the church on 18 January 2024

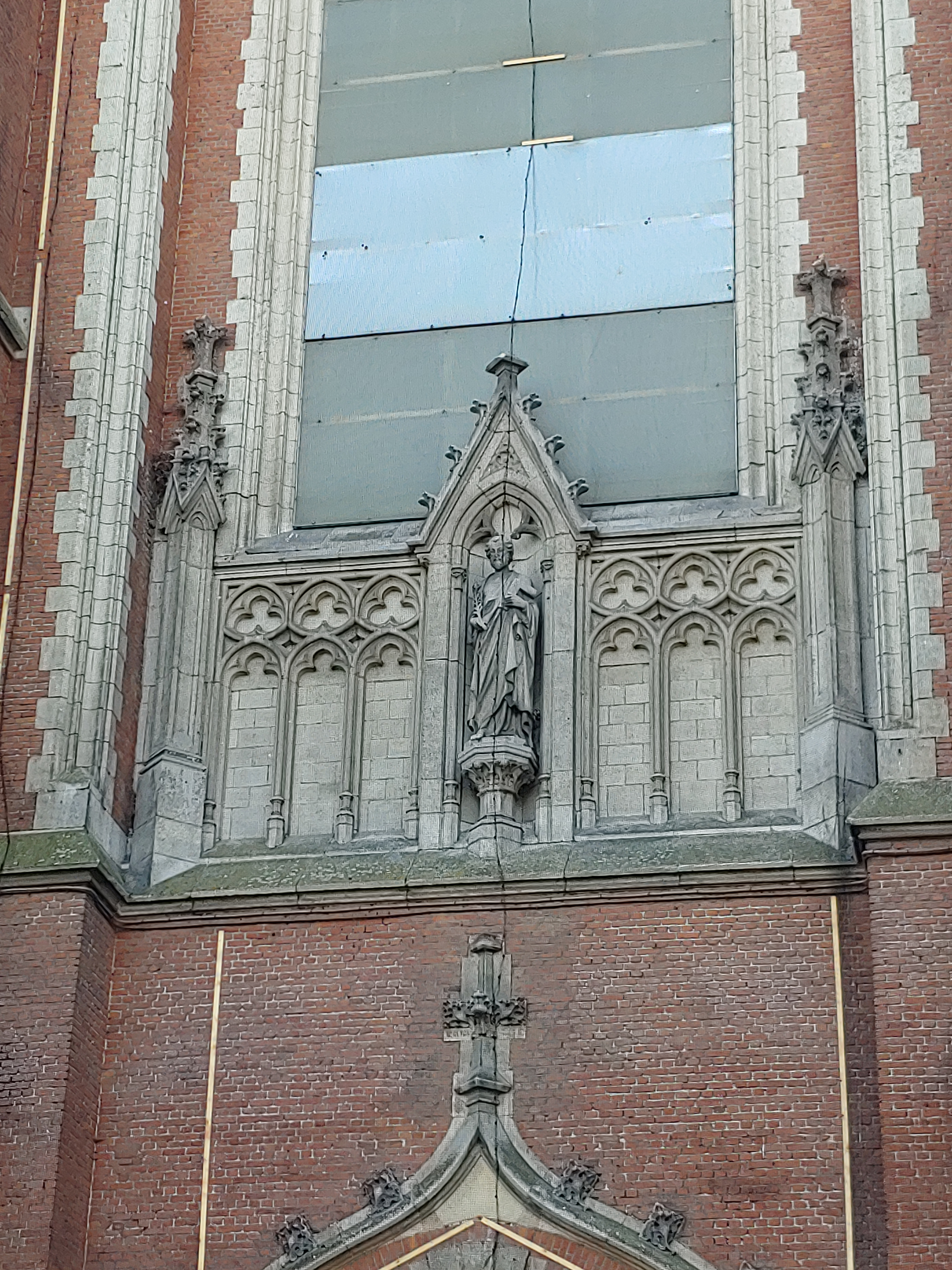
Detail of the tower

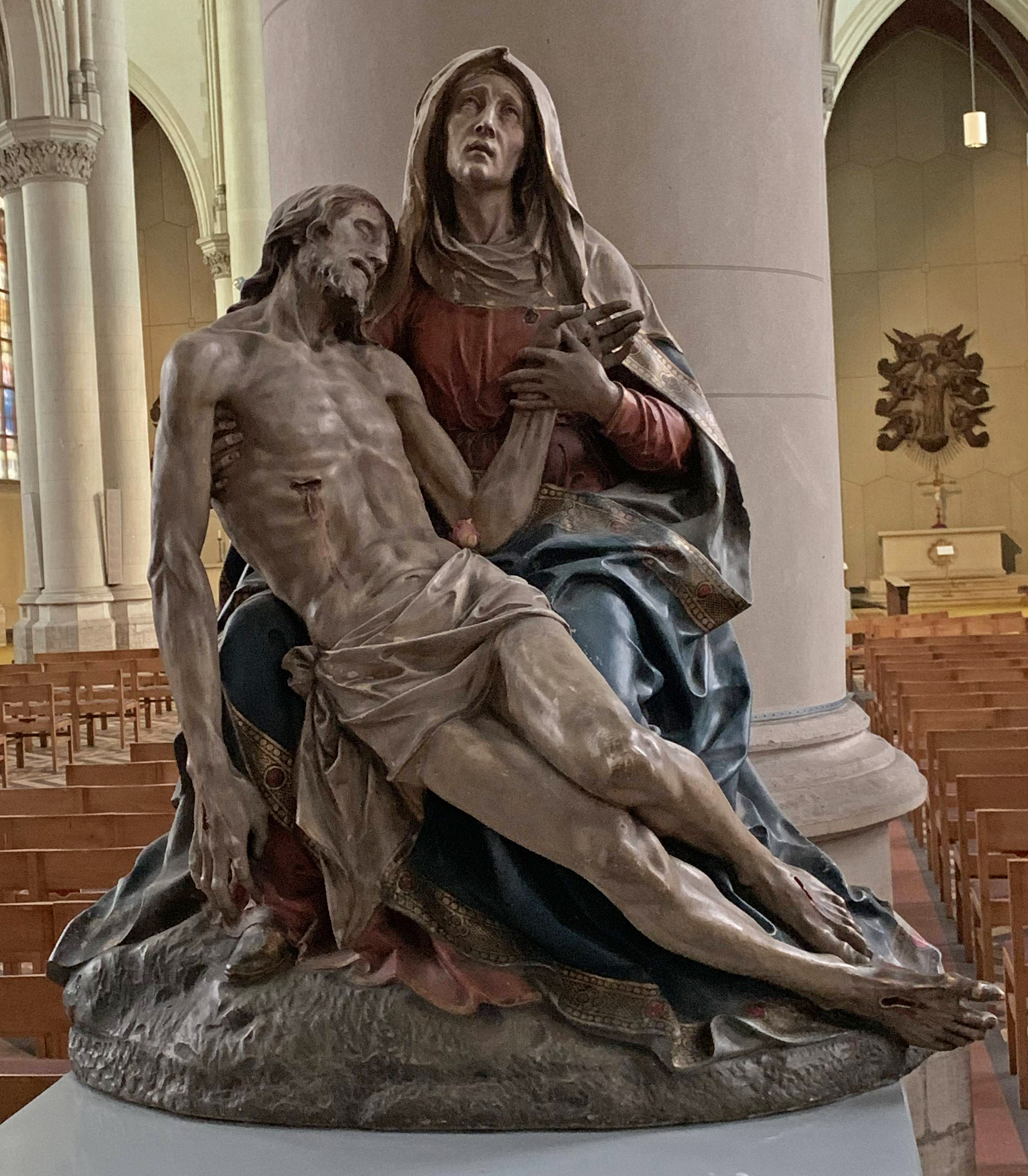
Piëta inside the church
