= Meldert =

Village in Belgium

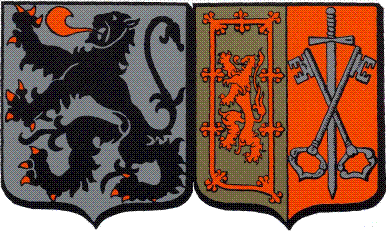
Coat of Arms of Meldert

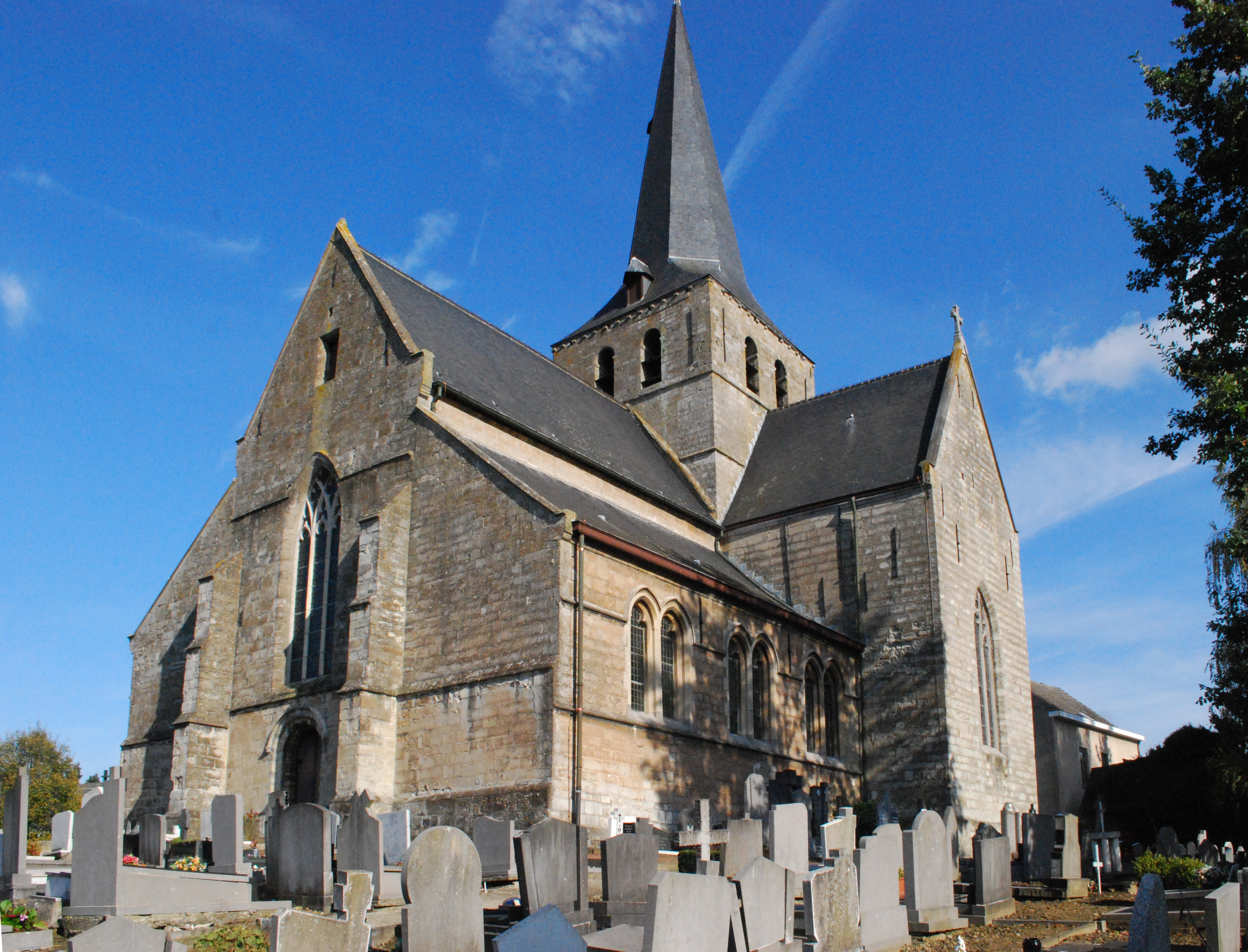
Church of Saint Walburga

Meldert is a village in the Belgian province of East Flanders and is a submunicipality of Aalst. It was an independent municipality until the municipal reorganization of 1977. Baardegem is located in the Denderstreek east of Aalst, against the border with Flemish Brabant. The total area is 883 ha and the number of inhabitants is approximately 2800.

== History ==
Meldert was mentioned in 1168. Until the 18th-century it belonged to the land of Asse under the Dukes of Brabant. The Women's Abbey of Vorst owned large properties of Meldert, including the Kravaalbos. Meldert was connected to the Affligem Abbey. In 1521, Carolus de Croy had a castle built near the Saint-Roch Chapel (with a straight avenue to the church), which burned down the same year.
