= Archaeological museum of Velzeke =

Coordinates: 50.8839°N 3.7794°E

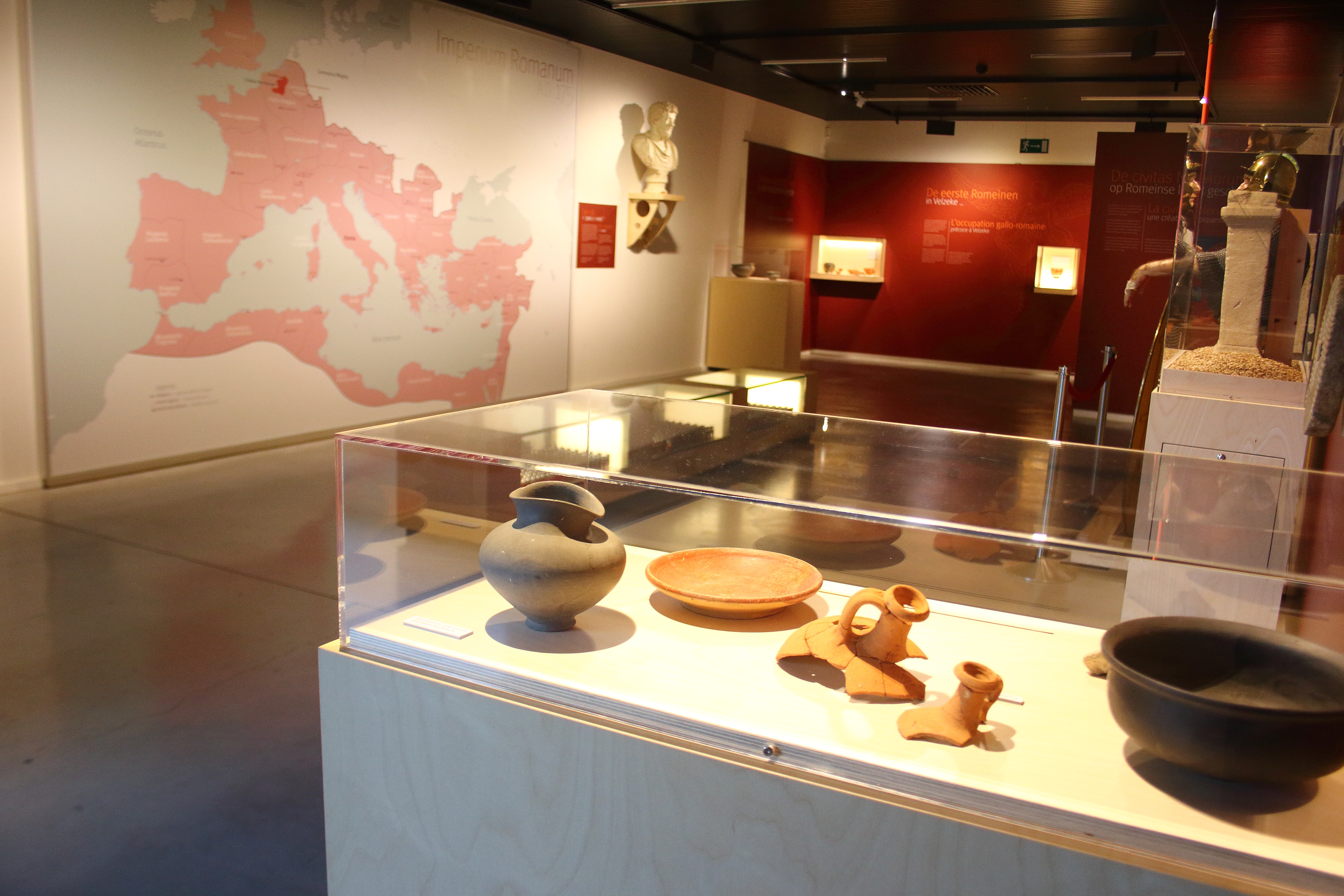
Archaeological museum of Velzeke

The archaeological museum of Velzeke (Dutch: Archeocentrum Velzeke) is a museum located on the Paddestraat in Velzeke-Ruddershove in Zottegem, Belgium. It focuses on prehistorical times and the Gallo-Roman period. The museum opened its doors in 1972.

The museum is located in Velzeke, a vicus where two Roman roads crossed (Boulogne-Tongeren and Bavay-north). It is the starting point for the signposted tourist route Viae Romanae Velzeke-Bavay which follows the old Roman road to Bavay.

Archeologists found several Roman artefacts on the archaeological site next to the museum. In 1971 a bronze statue was found, known as the 'Venus of Velzeke'. A hoard of third-century Roman coins has been discovered at Velzeke, including 91 denarii (ranging in date from the reign of Septimius Severus to that of Gordian III) and 93 antoniniani (ranging in date from the reign of Elagabalus to that of Postumus). Since 2021 new excavations take place on the site. An archaeological park will be built, comprising reconstructed Roman villas and roads. In 1998 a statue of Julius Caesar was erected on the village square close to the museum.

== Images ==
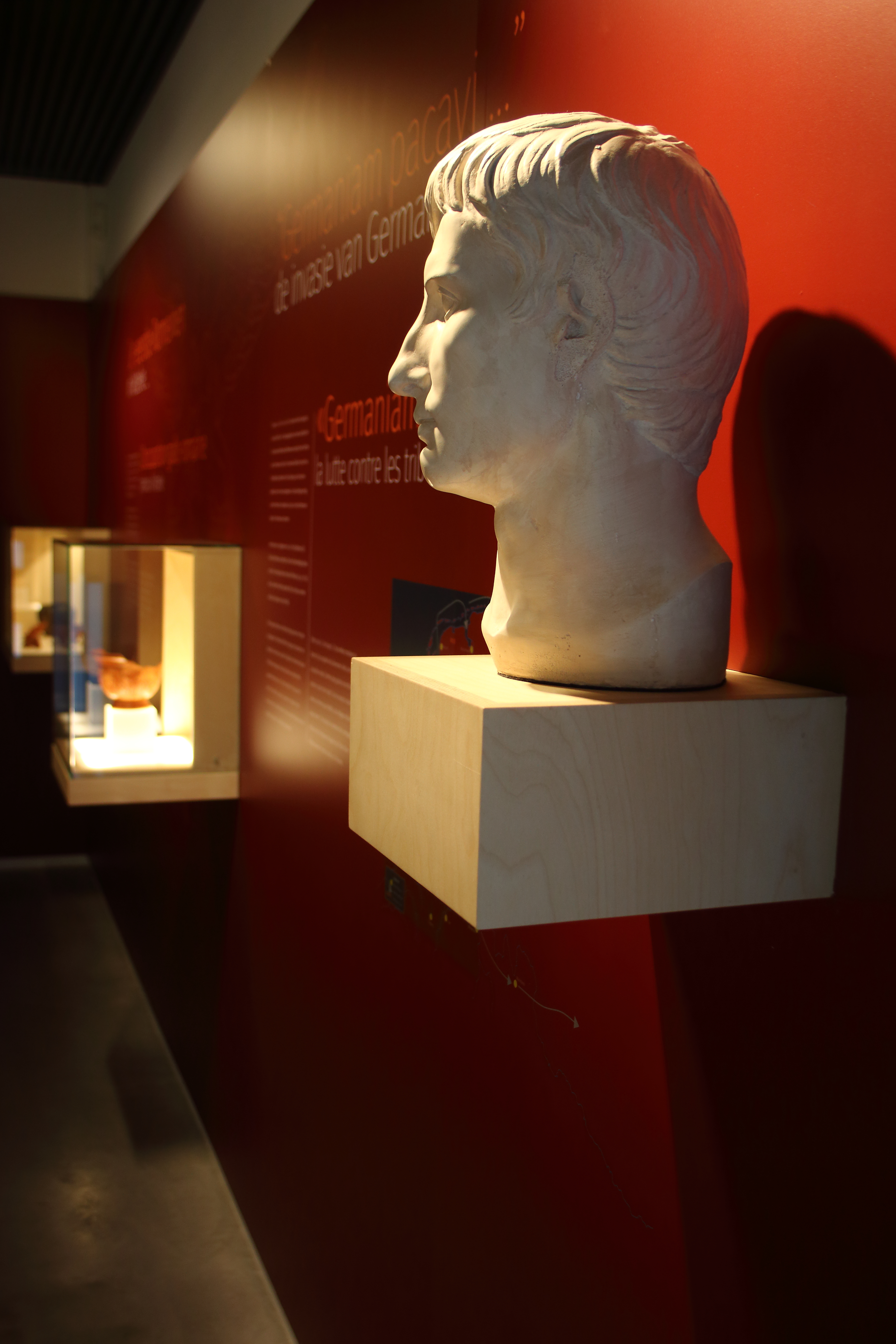

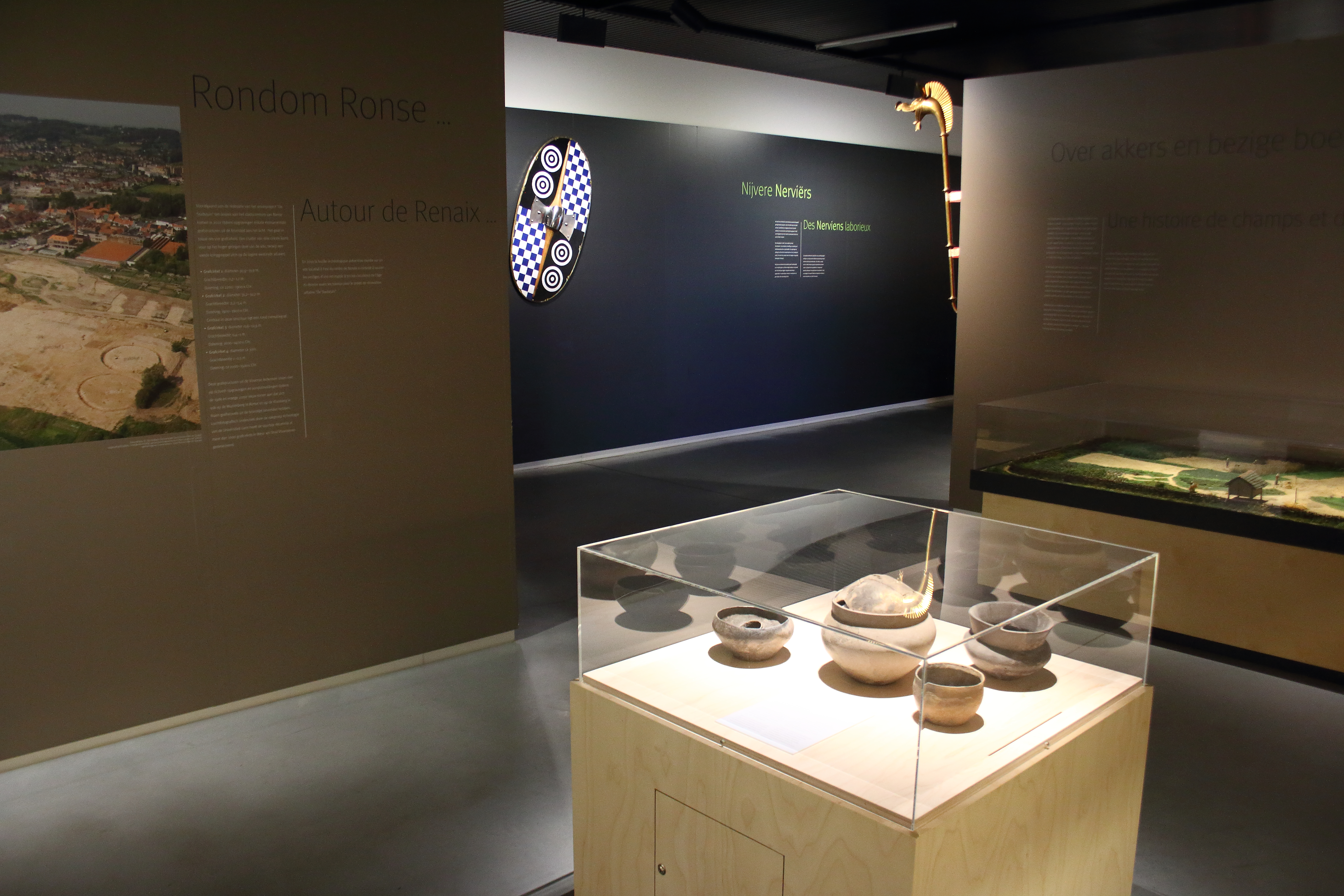

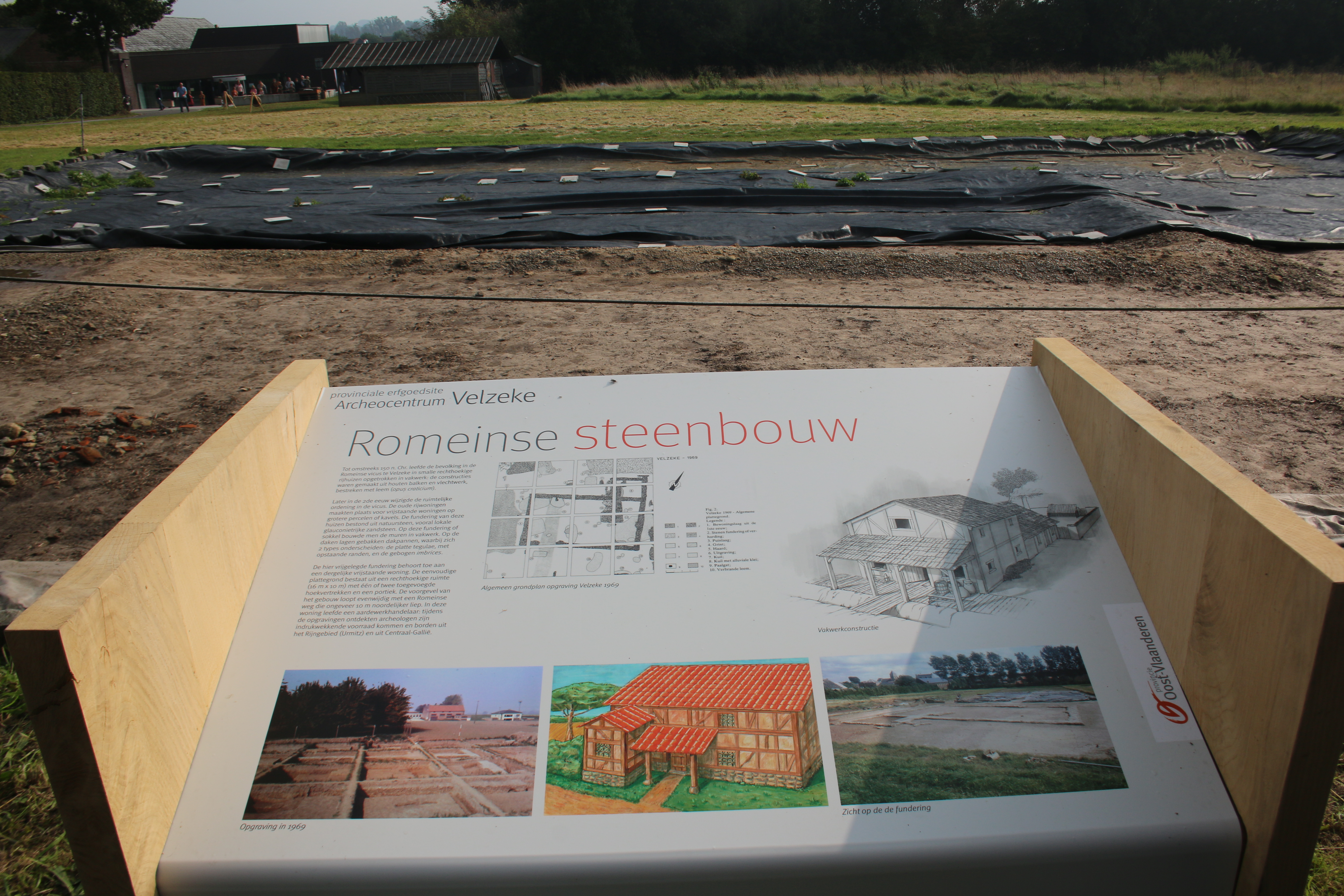

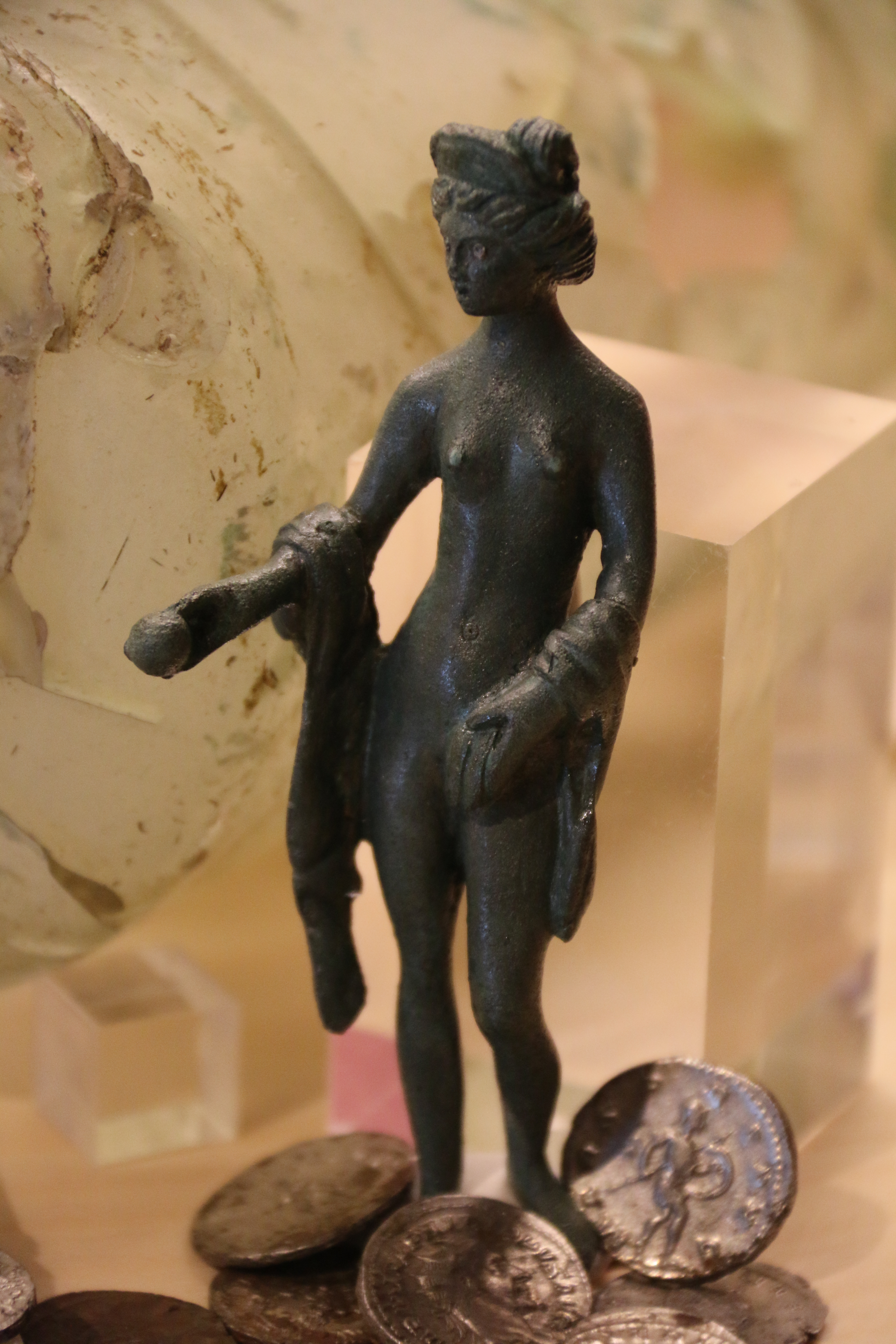
