= Sint-Goriks-Oudenhove =

- Village
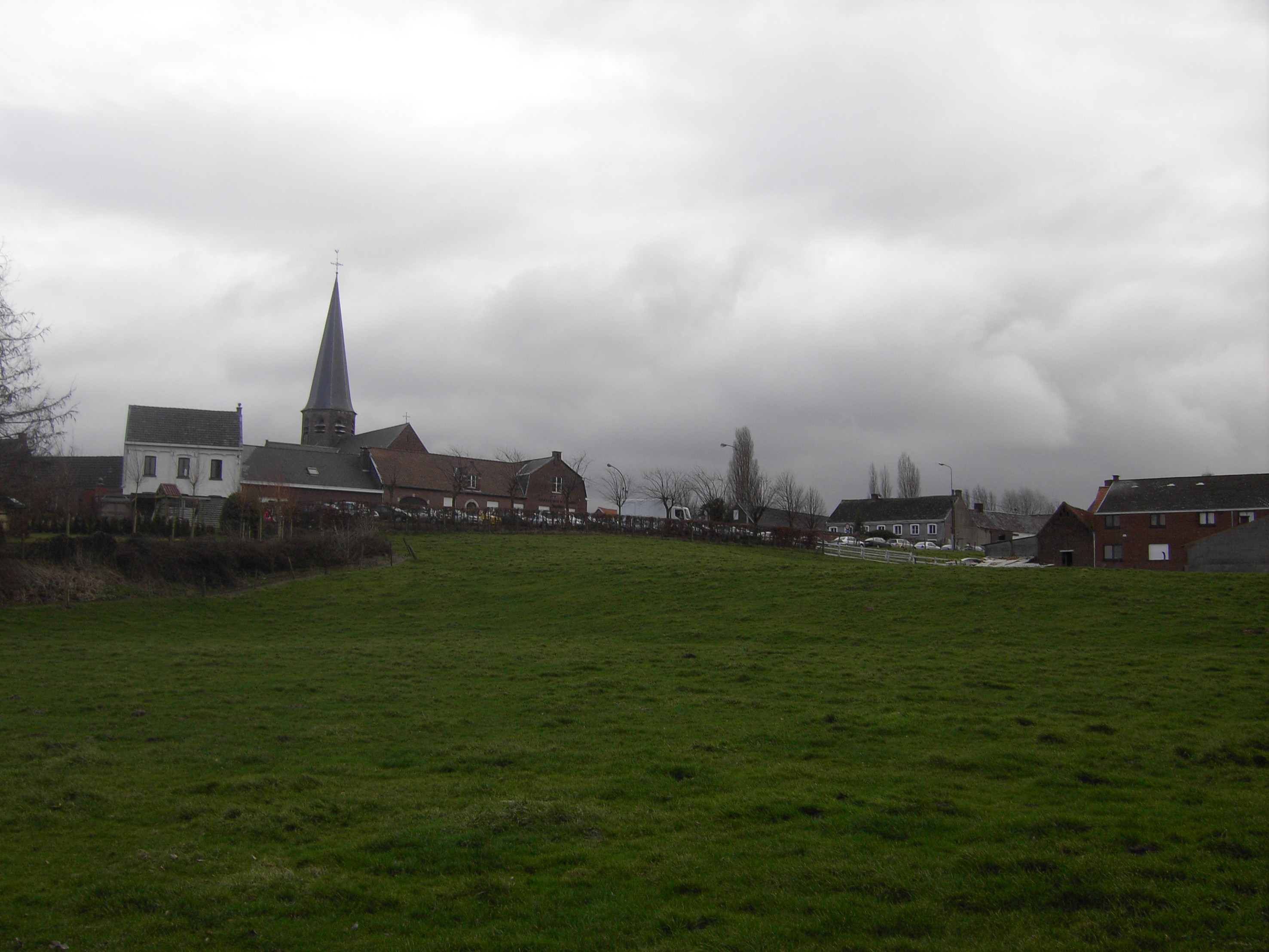

- Location within Belgium
- Coordinates: 50°51′N 3°47′E
- Country: Belgium
- Province: East Flanders
- Municipality: Zottegem

Area
  - Total: 5.62 km^{2} (2.17 sq mi)

Population (2021)
  - Total: 937
  - Density: 167/km^{2} (432/sq mi)

Sint-Goriks-Oudenhove is a village situated in the municipality of Zottegem, Belgium. It is located in the Flemish Ardennes, the hilly southern part of the province of East Flanders.

Its name refers to Saint Gaugericus (En. Saint Gery), Bishop of Cambrai during the 7th century. Sint-Goriks-Oudenhove used to contain two small heerlijkheden which were part of the barony of Zottegem.

Sint-Goriks-Oudenhove in an agricultural community. In 1970, the municipality merged into Zottegem.

== Gallery ==
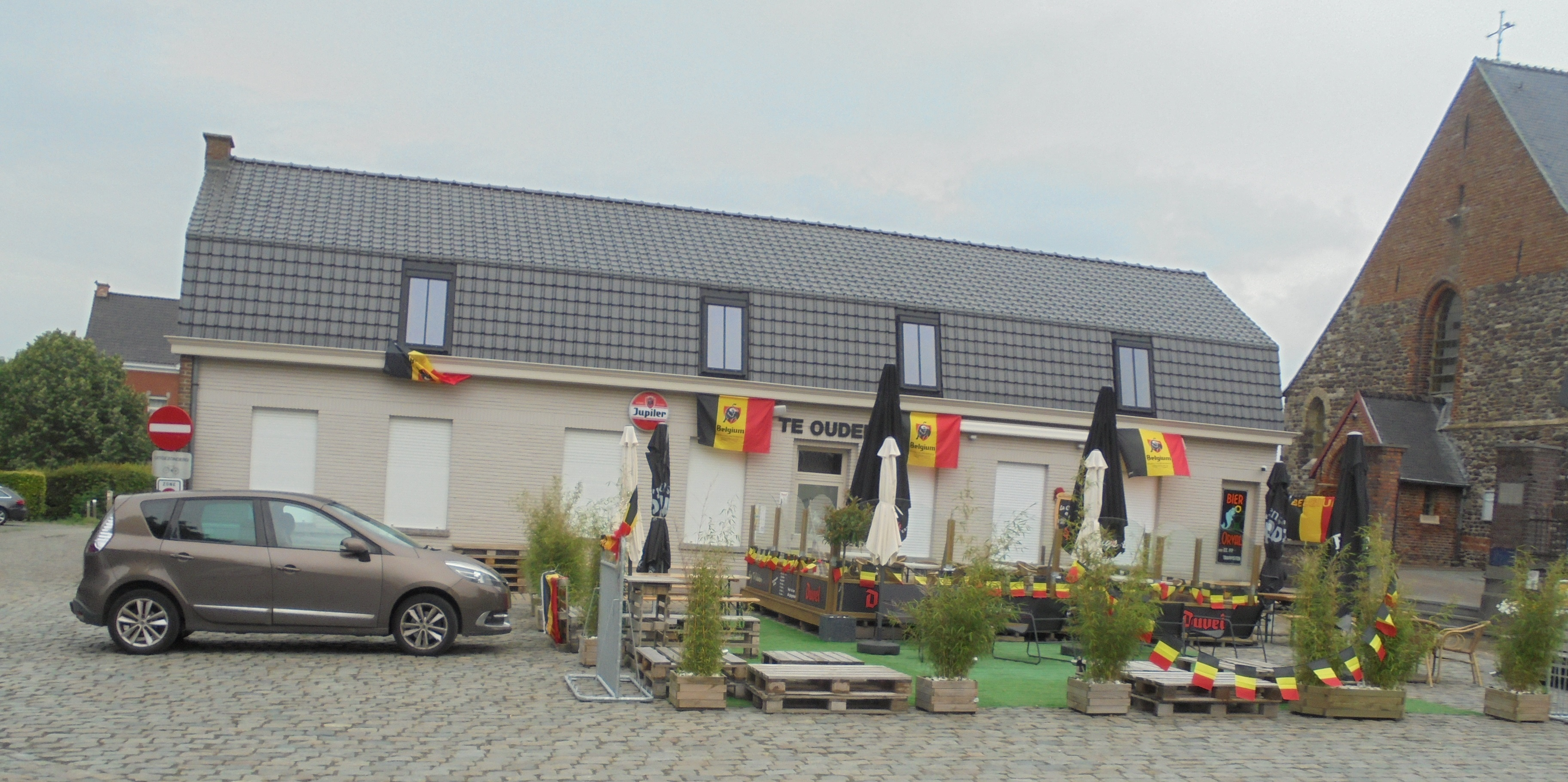
Pub during the 2021 football championship

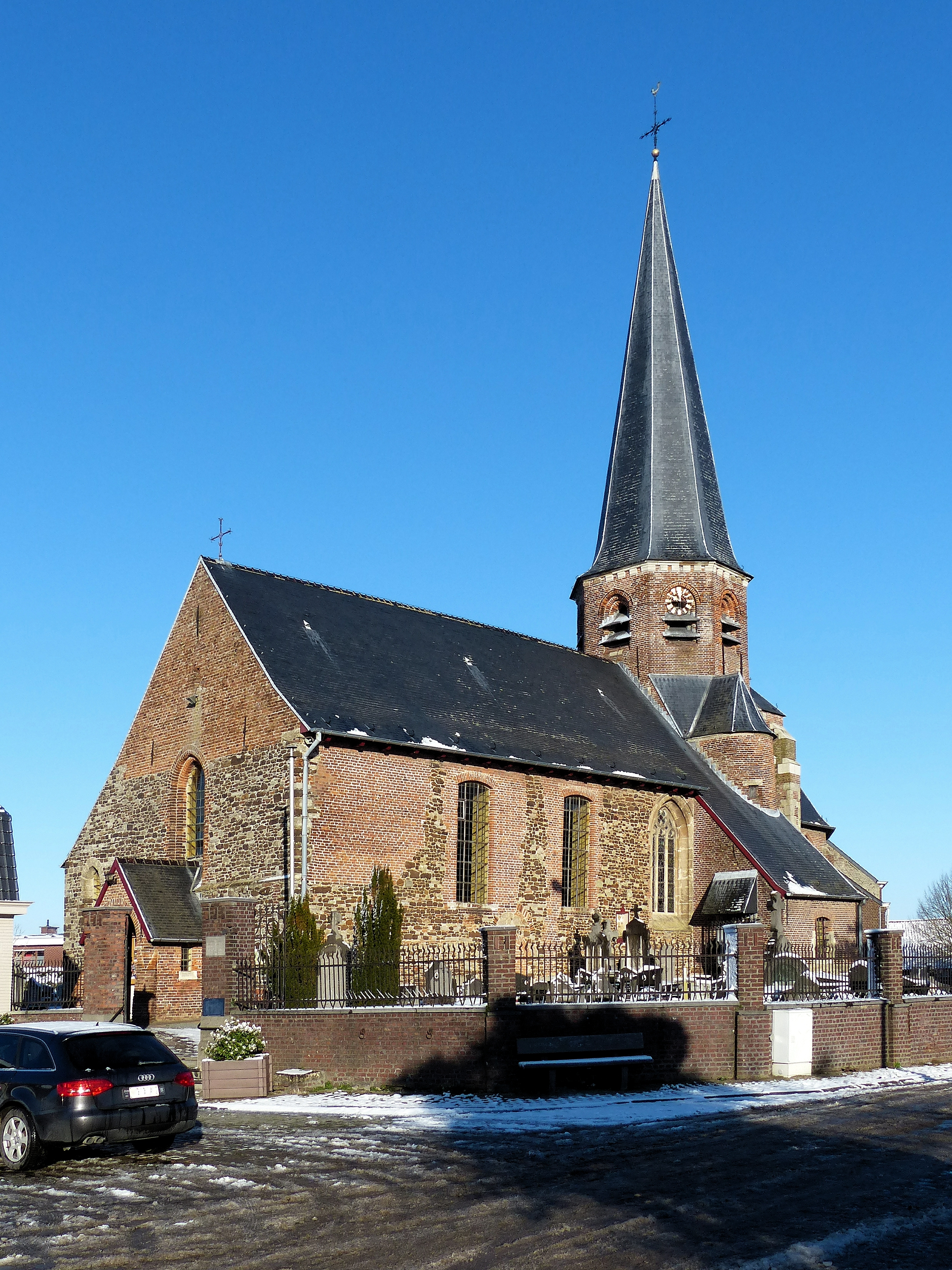
St Gorik Church

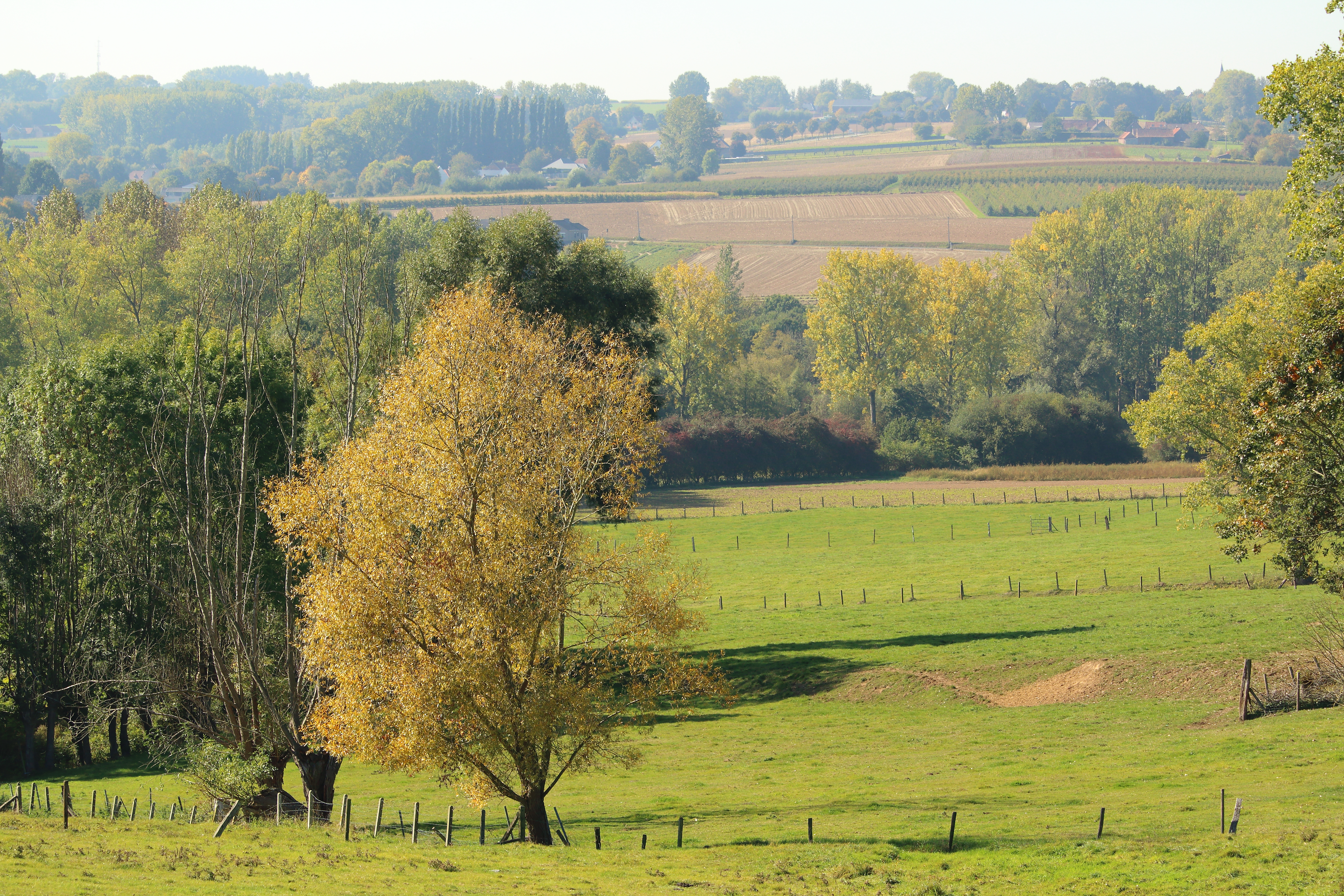
Landscape near Sint-Goriks-Oudenhove

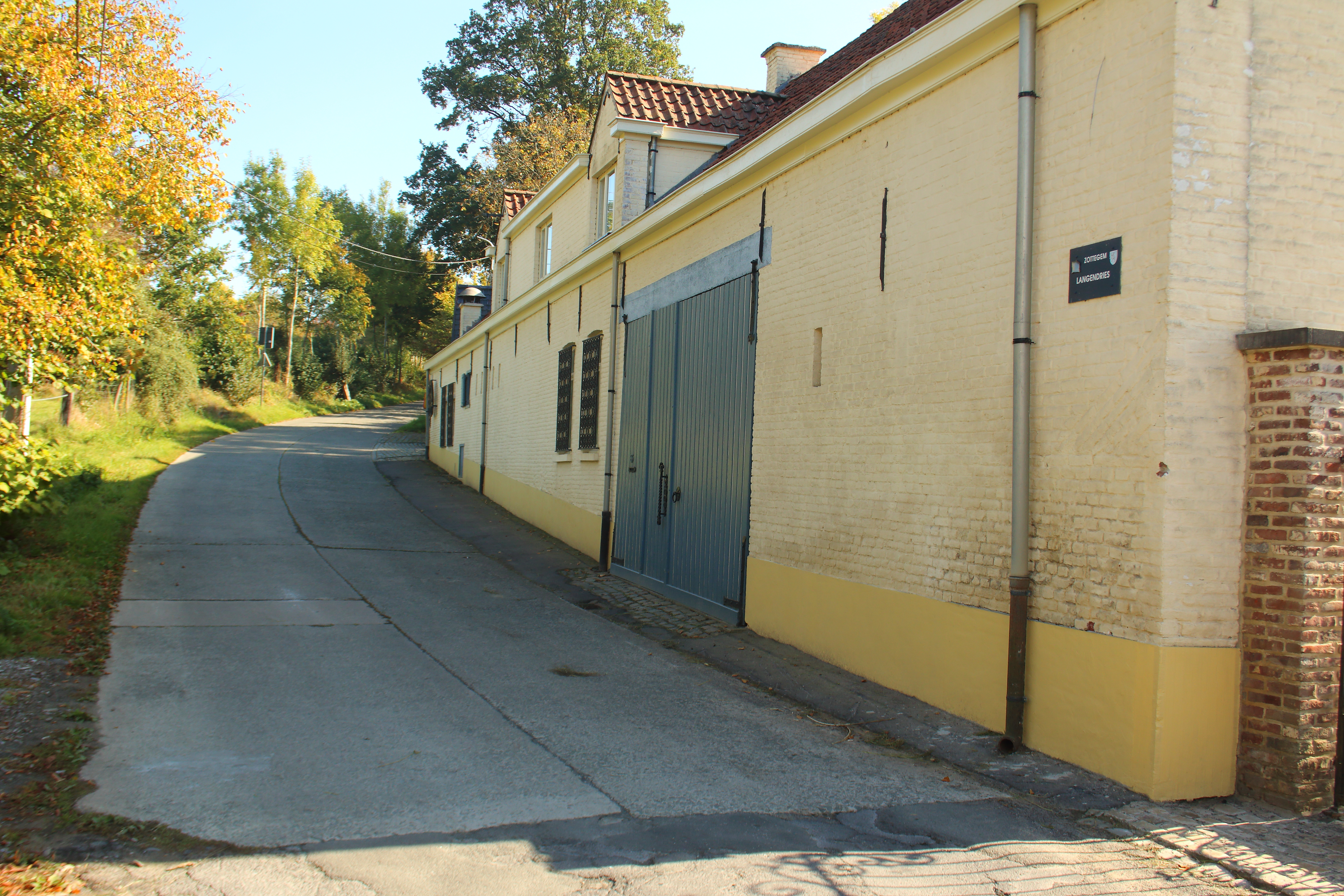
Street view
