= Paul Van Cauwenberge =

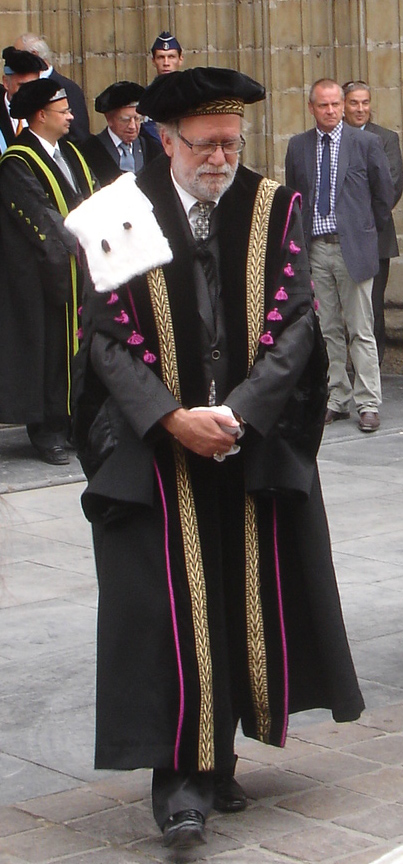
Prof. dr. Paul Van Cauwenberghe

Paul Van Cauwenberge (born 1 April 1949 in Zottegem) is a Belgian academic and chairman of Hogeschool Gent. He was the rector of Ghent University from 1 October 2005 until 1 October 2013. His successor is Anne De Paepe.

== Career ==
Van Cauwenberge is a senior full professor in ear, nose and throat surgery (Otorhinolaryngology) at the faculty of Medicine and Health Sciences.

Van Cauwenberge started his career at Ghent University in 1973. He was the dean of the faculty of Medicine and Health Sciences from 1999 until 2004. Since 1978, he has served in the Board of Governors and the executive board of Ghent University.

Van Cauwenberge was managing Ghent University as a rector from 1 October 2005 until 30 September 2013. He was being assisted by vice-rector Luc Moens. On October 1, 2013, he was succeeded by Anne De Paepe. On the same day he has been assigned as chairman of Hogeschool Gent.
