= Zottegem =

- City and municipality
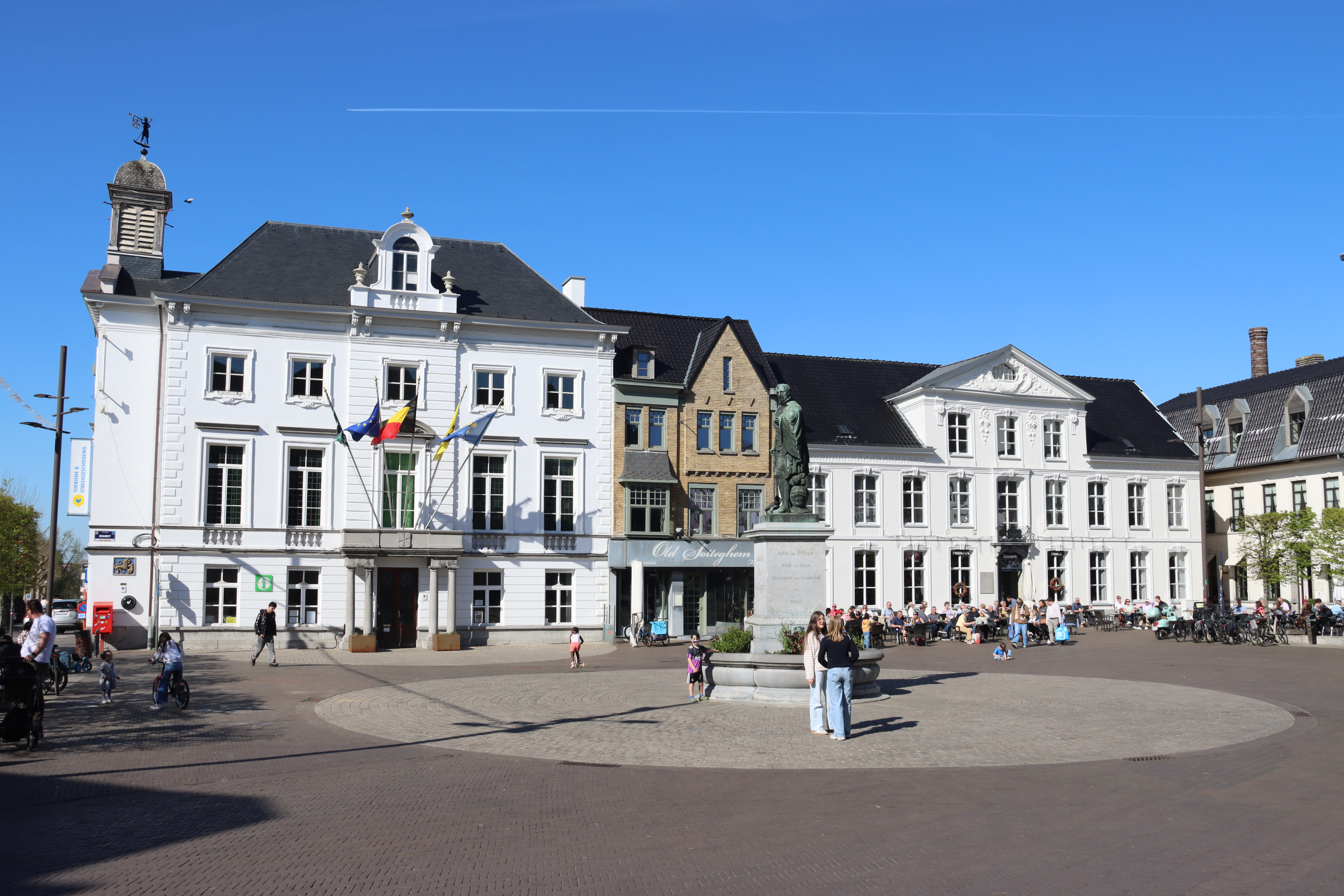
- the market square, the town hall, House of "The Catholic Circle" and the statue of Egmont

- Flag Coat of arms

- Location of Zottegem in East Flanders
- Interactive map of Zottegem
- Location in Belgium
- Coordinates: 50°52′N 03°48′E
- Country: Belgium
- Community: Flemish Community
- Region: Flemish Region
- Province: East Flanders
- Arrondissement: Aalst

Government
  - Mayor: Evelien De Both N-VA
  - Governing parties: CD&V, N-VA, Positief

Area
  - Total: 57.46 km^{2} (22.19 sq mi)

Population (2018-01-01)
  - Total: 26,373
  - Density: 459.0/km^{2} (1,189/sq mi)
- Postal codes: 9620
- NIS code: 41081
- Area codes: 09
- Website: www.zottegem.be and www.visit-zottegem.be

Zottegem (Dutch pronunciation: [ˈzɔtəɣɛm], Sotteghem and Sottegem in older English and French language sources) is a municipality and city located in Belgium and more particularly in Flanders, in the province of East Flanders. The municipality comprises the town of Zottegem proper and the villages of Elene, Erwetegem, Godveerdegem, Grotenberge, Leeuwergem, Oombergen, Sint-Goriks-Oudenhove, Sint-Maria-Oudenhove, Strijpen and Velzeke-Ruddershove. On 1 January 2018, Zottegem had a total population of 26,373. The total area is 56.66 km^{2} which gives a population density of 470 inhabitants per km^{2}.

Zottegem is part of the hilly geographical area of the Flemish Ardennes (Vlaamse Ardennen); the hills and cobblestone streets (Paddestraat) are regular locations in the springtime cycle classics of Flanders.

The city is known for its ties with Lamoral, Count of Egmont. Lamoral has an Egmont Castle (Egmontkasteel), an Egmont museum (Egmontkamer) and two statues of Egmont in the centre of Zottegem. He is buried in Egmont's crypt (Egmontcrypte) under the Church of the Assumption of Our Lady.

Leeuwergem Castle in Elene is an 18th-century stately home. There also the ruins of an 18th-century windmill can be found. Breivelde Castle in Grotenberge is surrounded by an English landscape garden. The archaeological museum of Velzeke exhibits findings from Gallo-Roman culture.

== Places of interest ==
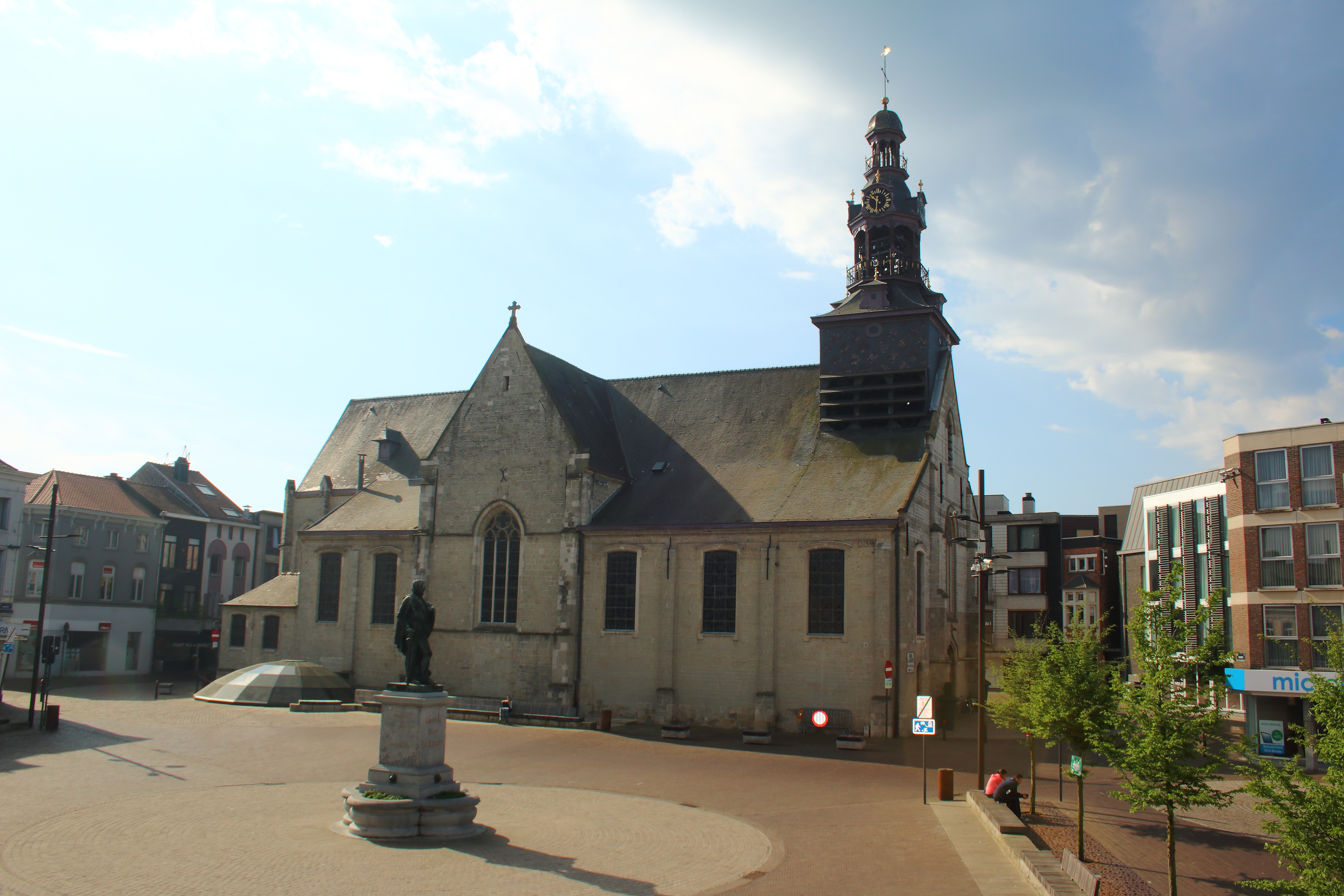
Church of the Assumption of Our Lady, Egmont's crypt

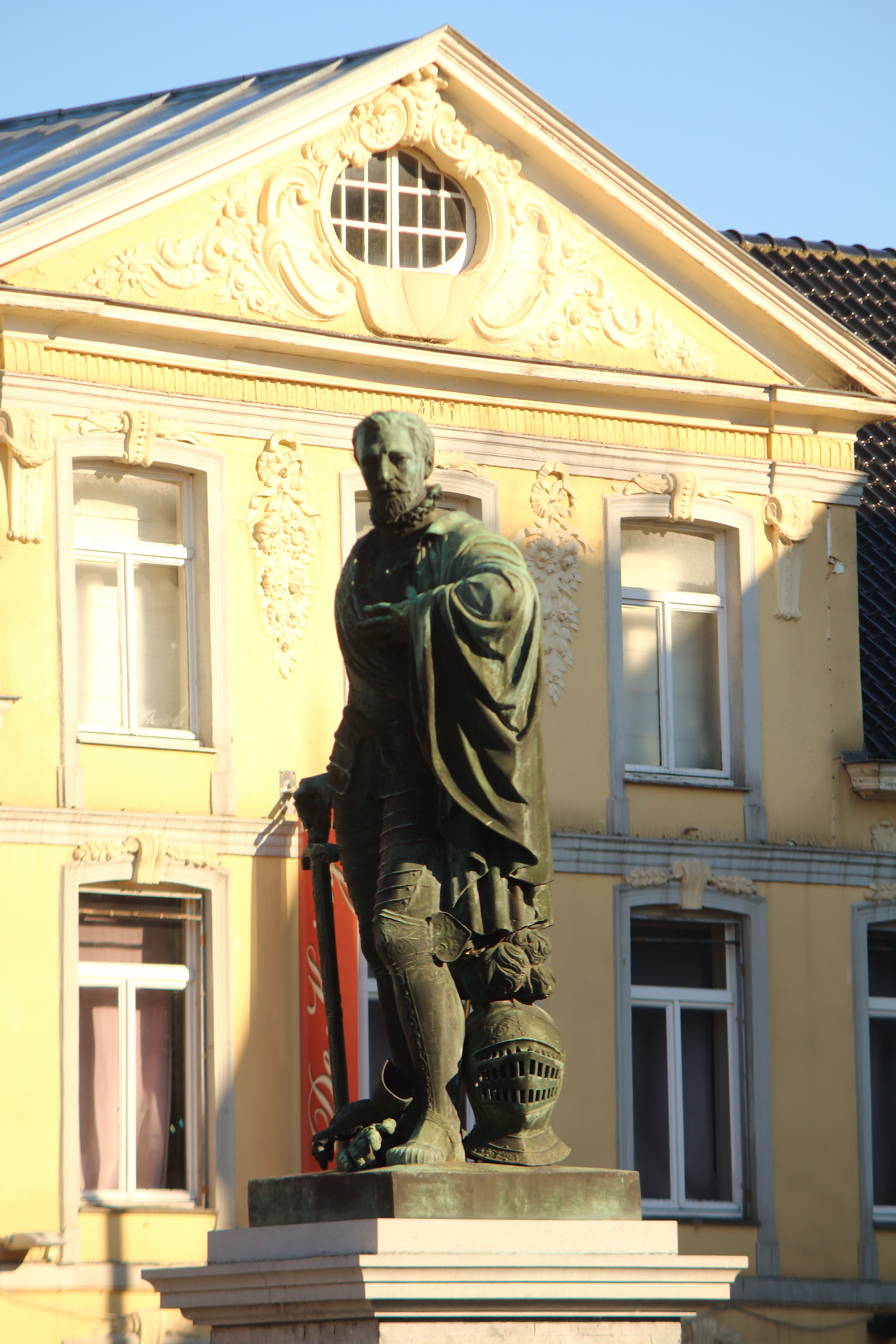
Statue of Egmont

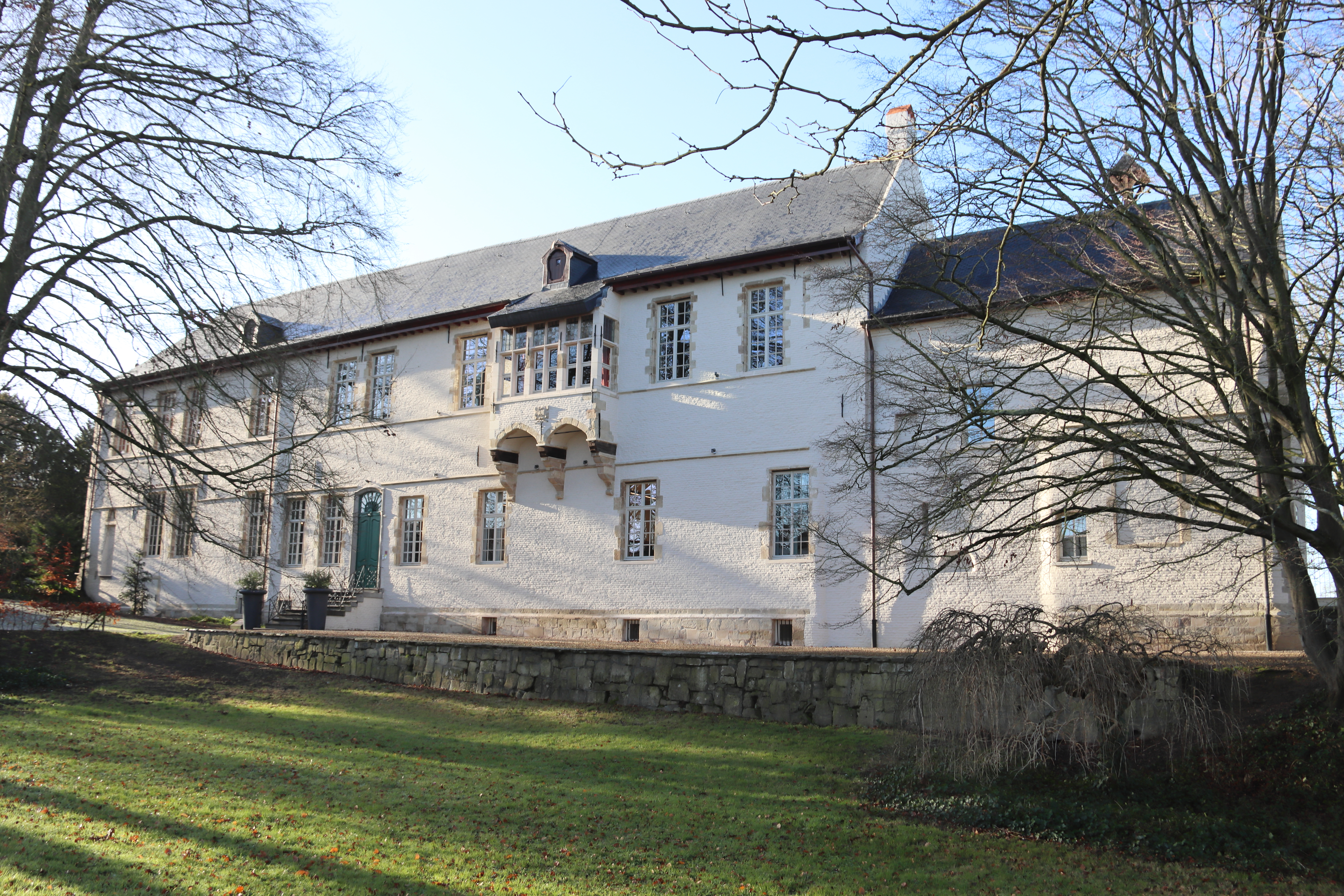
Egmont Castle

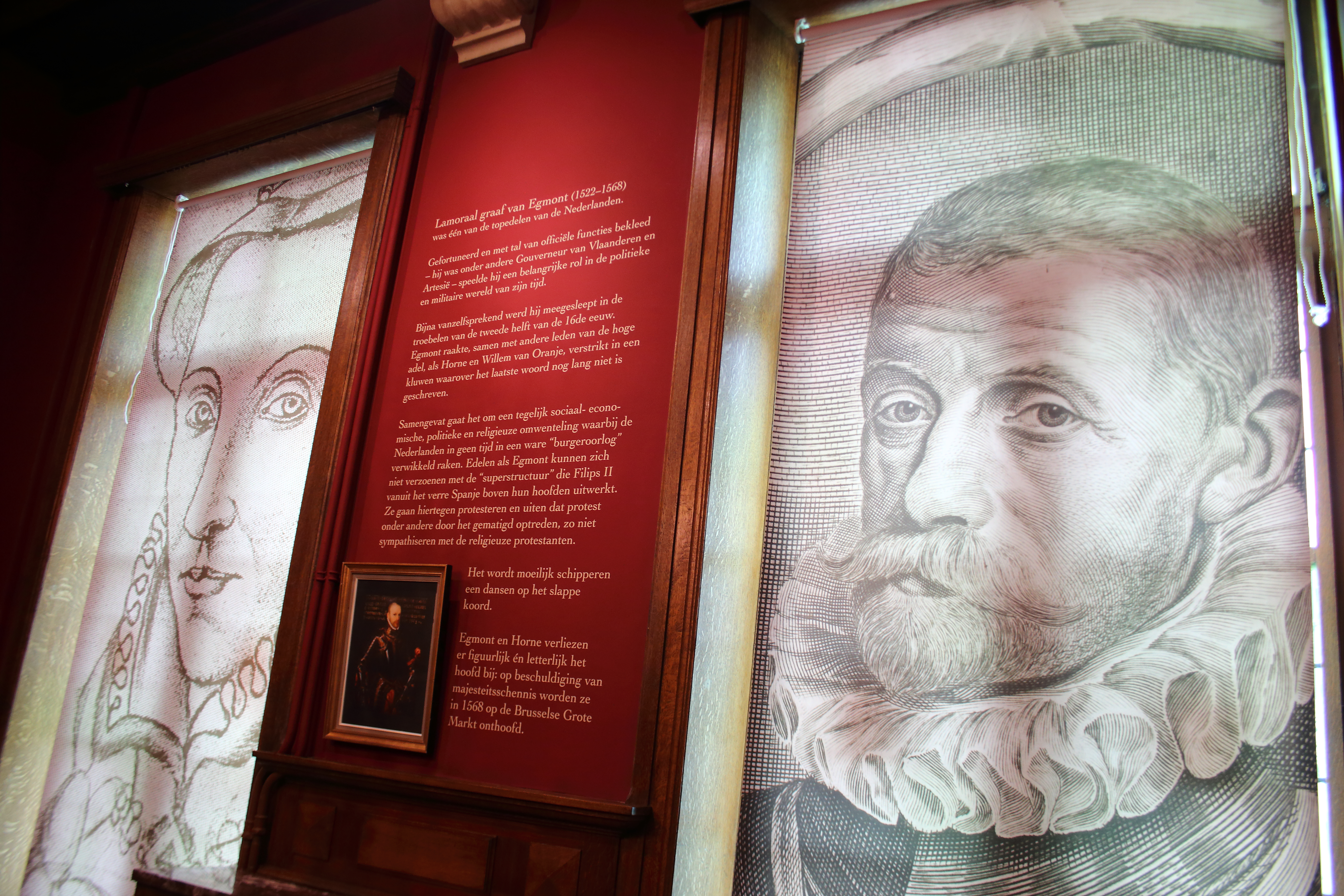
Egmont museum

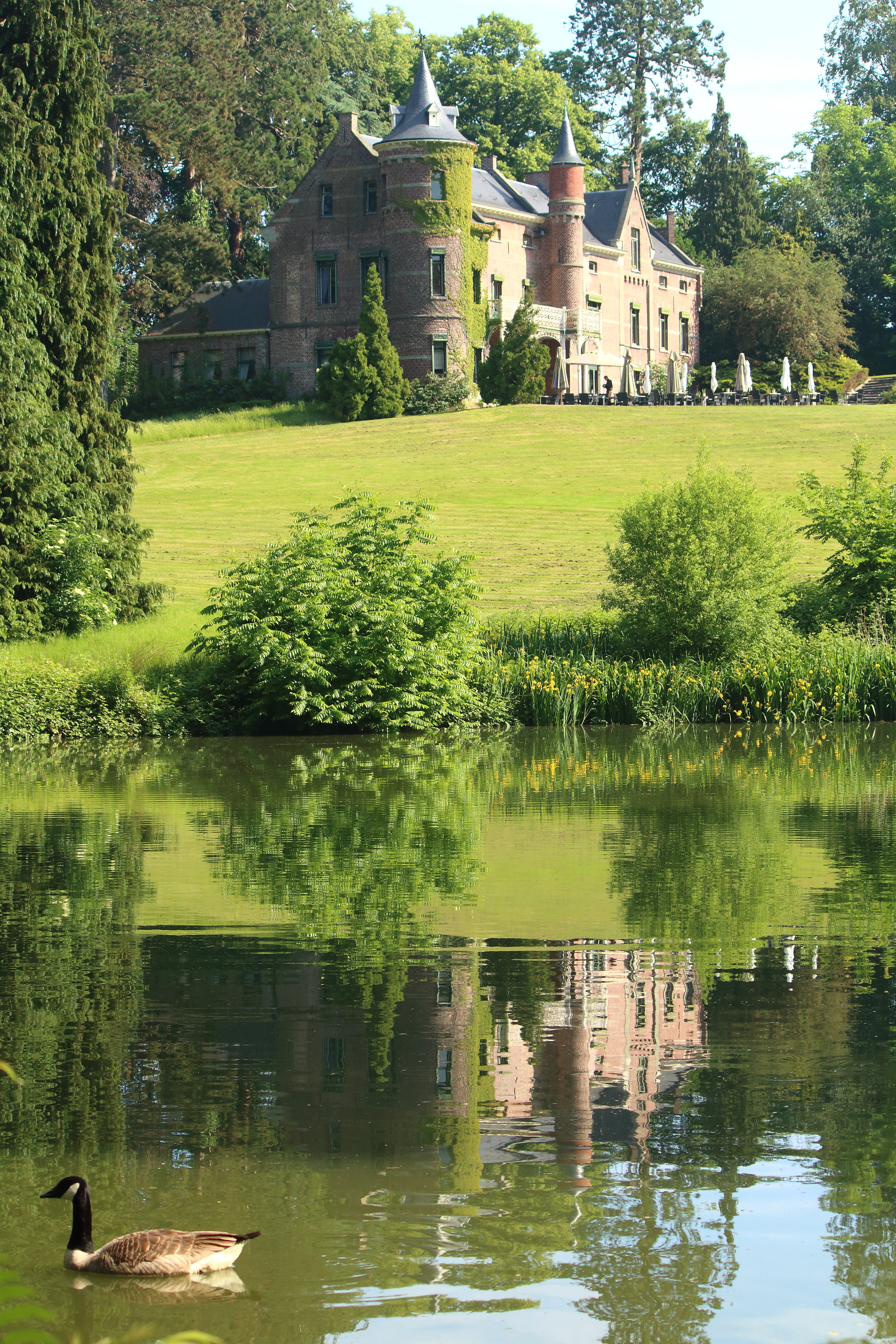
Breivelde Castle

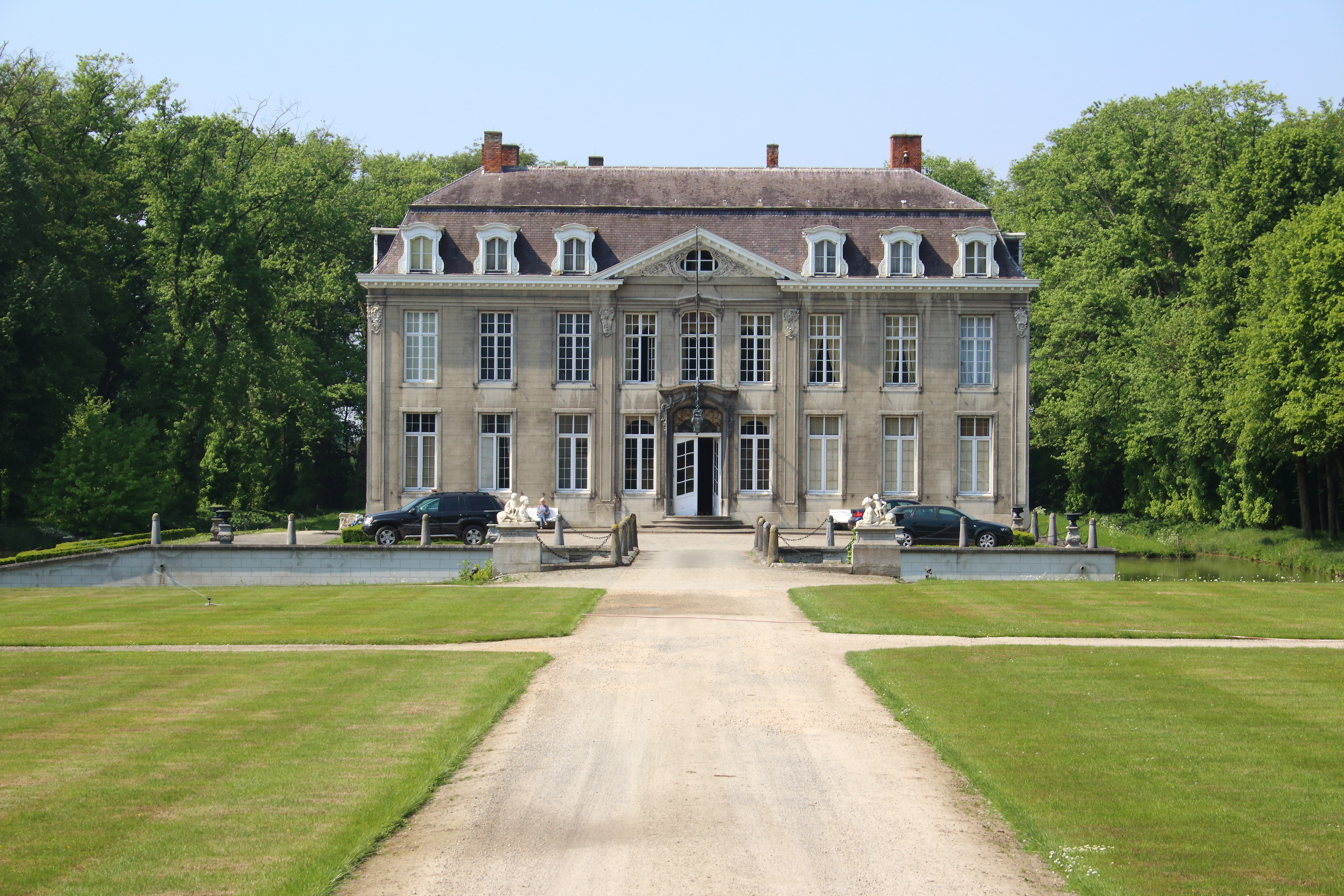
Leeuwergem Castle

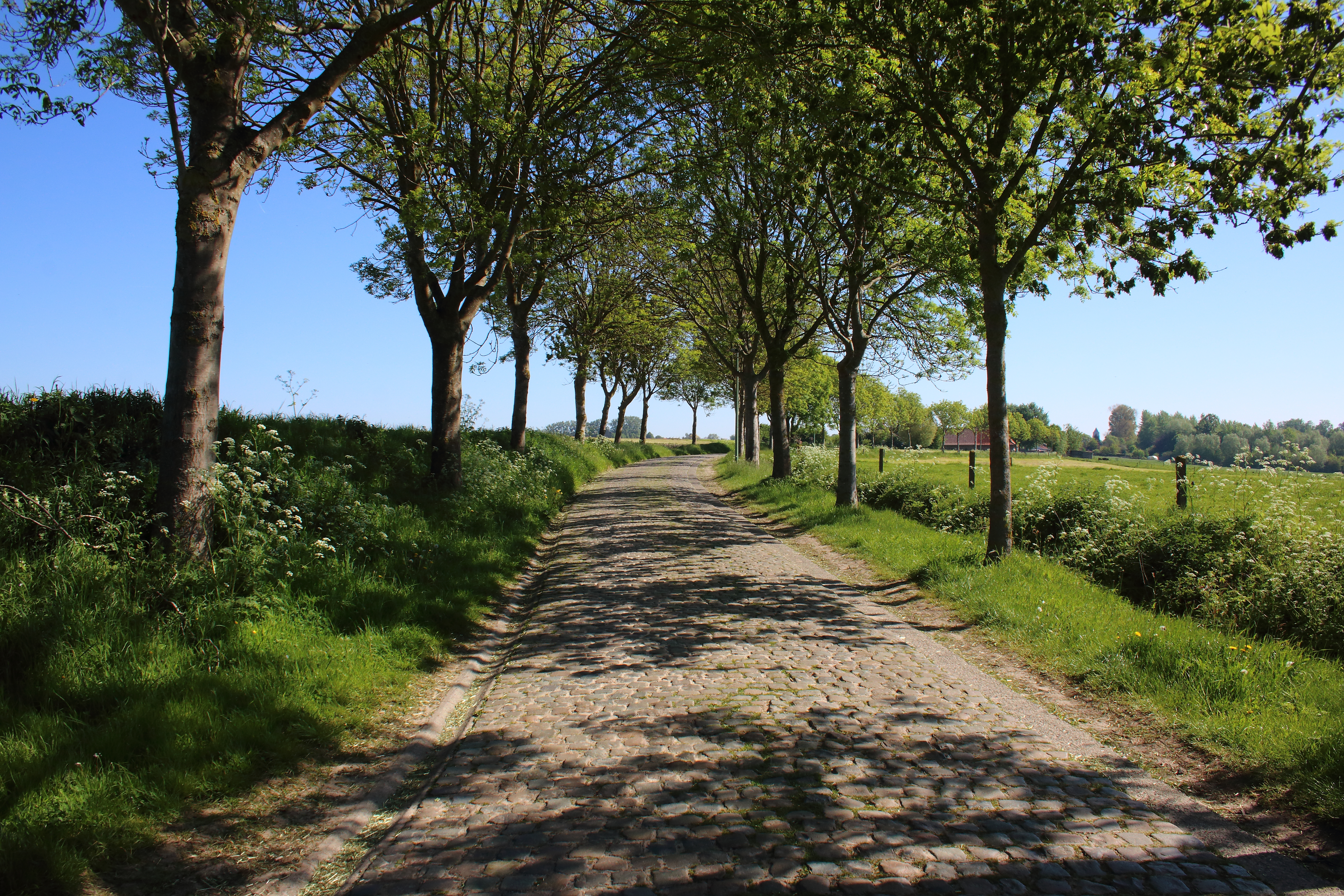
Paddestraat

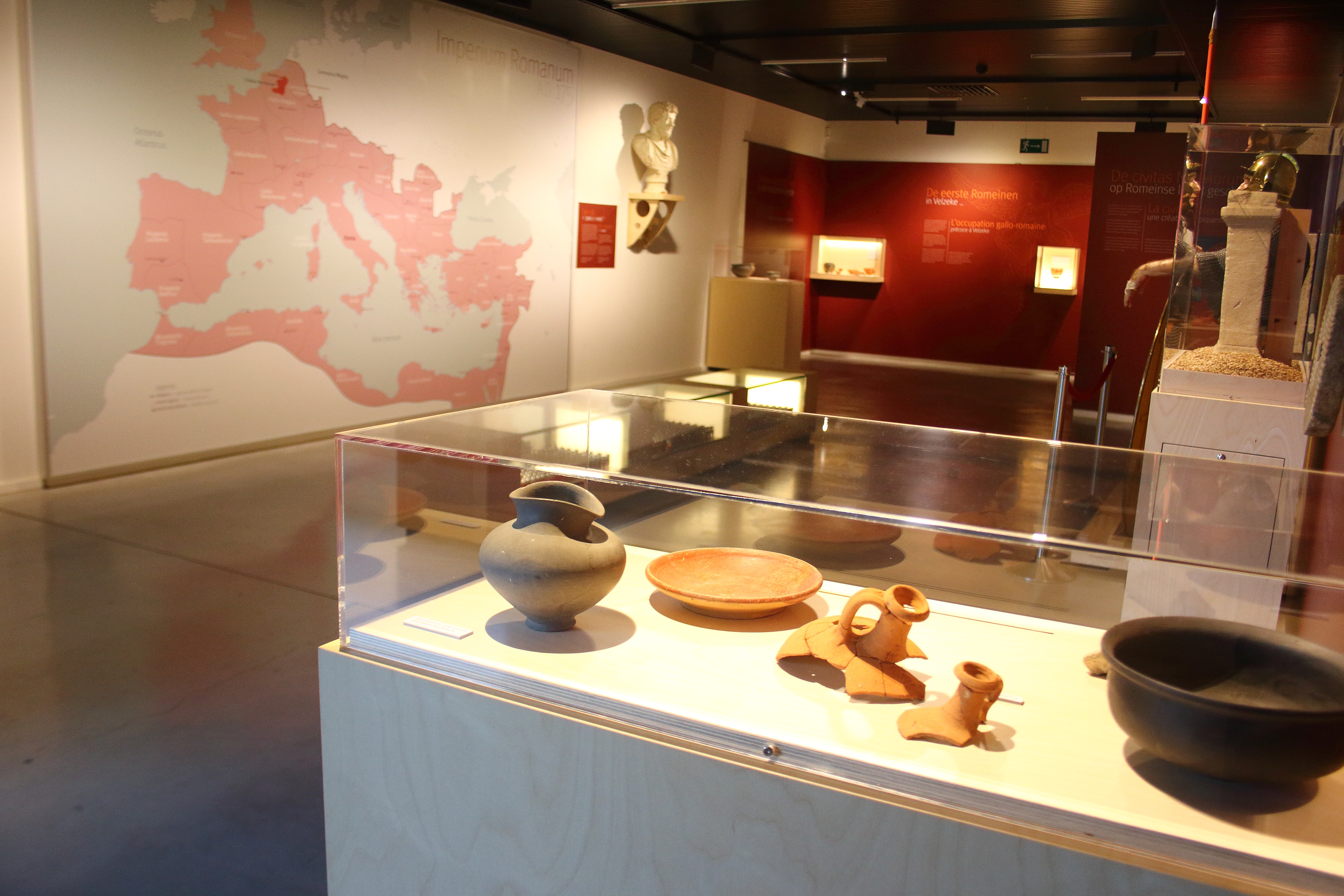
Archaeological museum of Velzeke

== Famous inhabitants ==
- Urbain Braems, football player and manager, lived in Zottegem
- Bart De Clercq, cyclist
- Patricia de Martelaere (b. in Zottegem), writer
- Anne De Paepe, former rector of Ghent University
- Jessy De Smet, singer
- Senne Lammens (b. in Zottegem), Belgian goalkeeper currently playing for Manchester United
- Lamoral, Count of Egmont, general and statesman, is buried in Zottegem
- Maarten Larmuseau (b. in Zottegem), genetic genealogist of KU Leuven
- Tim Matthys, football player, lives in Zottegem
- Laurent Merchiers, politician
- Lyne Renée (b. in Zottegem), actress
- Paul Van Cauwenberge, former rector of Ghent University
- Magali Uytterhaegen (b. in Zottegem), actress (The curiosity of Chance)

== See also ==
- Oomberg Airport
- Zwalm (River)
