= Windmill of Elene =

Belgian windmill

Coordinates: 50°53′19″N 3°48′46″E

The Windmill of Elene is a former windmill in Elene, Zottegem, Belgium.

The mill was built in 1762, following permission granted by Empress Maria-Theresa to Pieter Emanuel Joseph d'Hane. In the following centuries, it was owned by the heirs of the d'Hane de Steenhuyze family from Ghent.

The mill was damaged during World War I. Attempts to repair the mill stopped in 1923. It has not been operational since then. In 1979, the mill was protected as a monument. In 1984, urgent conservation repairs were carried out. Despite this, the windmill is in a state of decay.

== Gallery ==
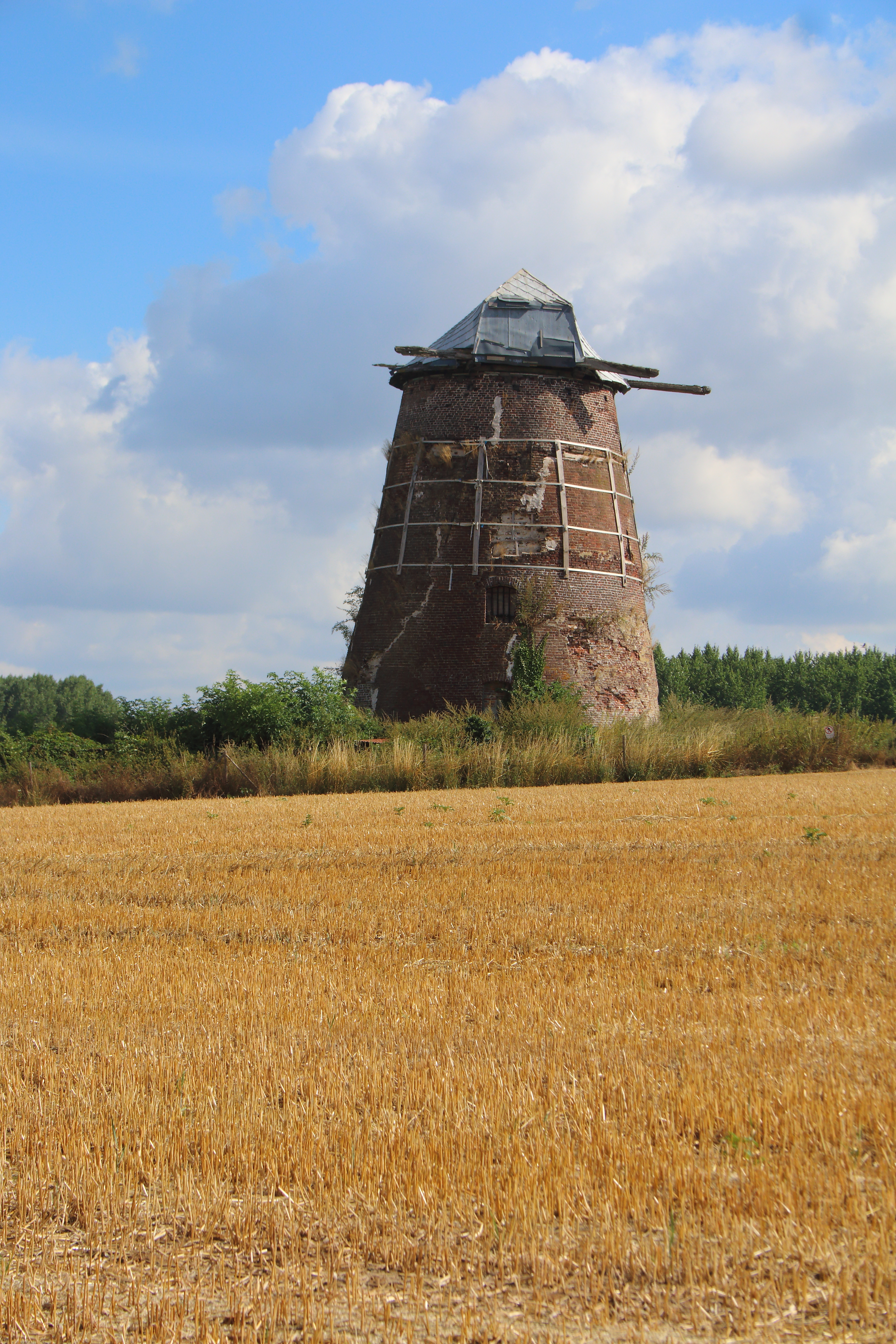

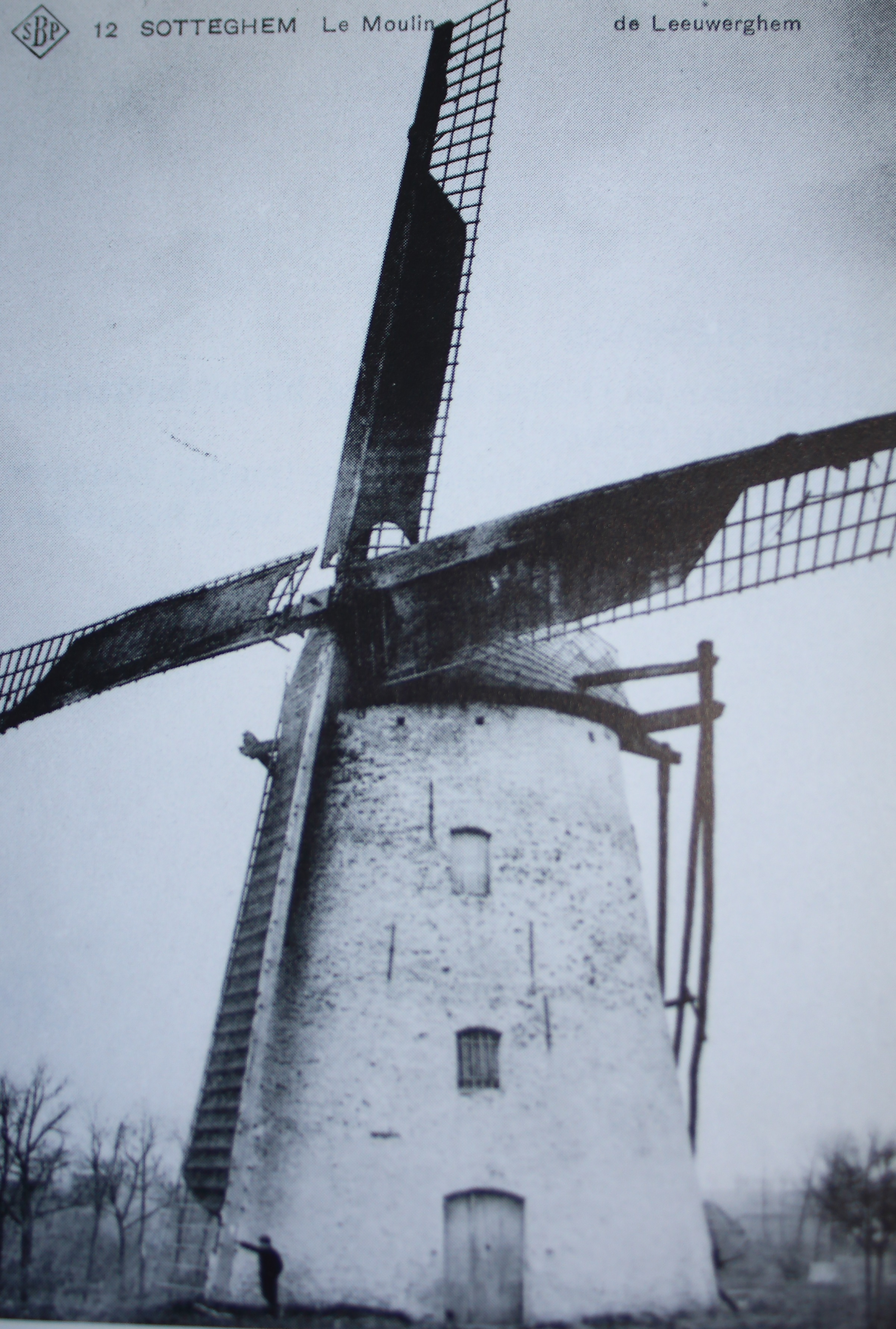

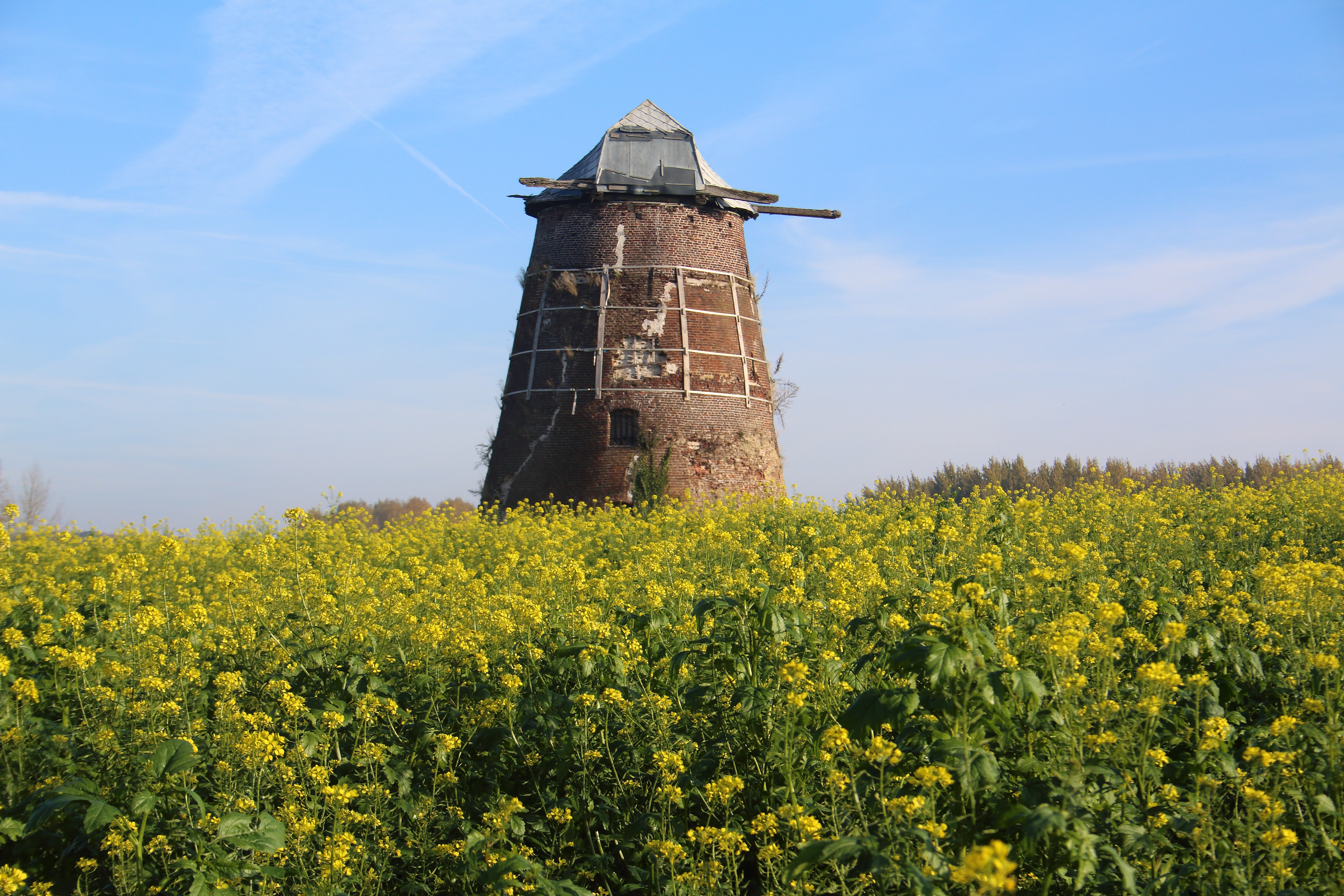

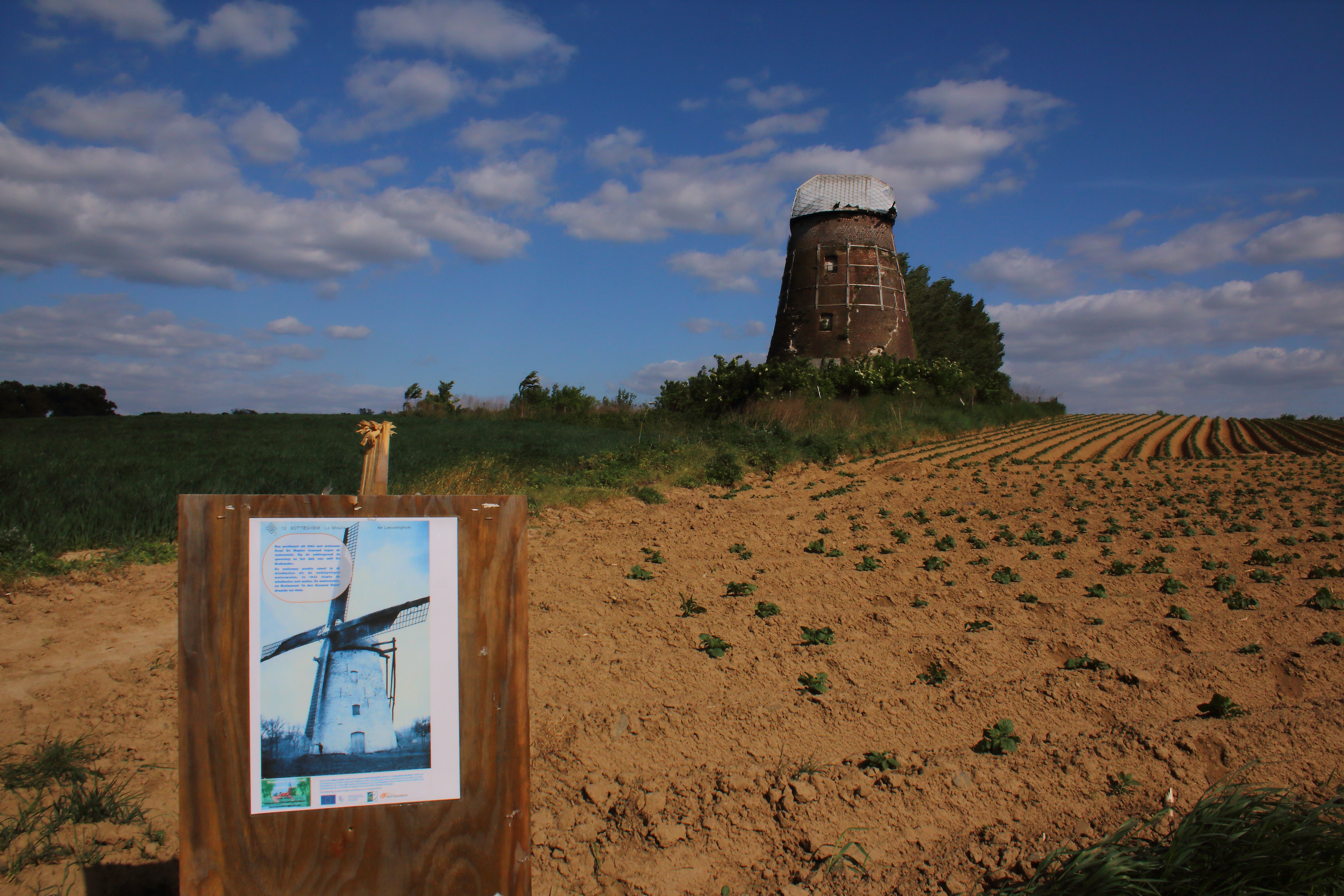
