= Grotenberge =

- Village
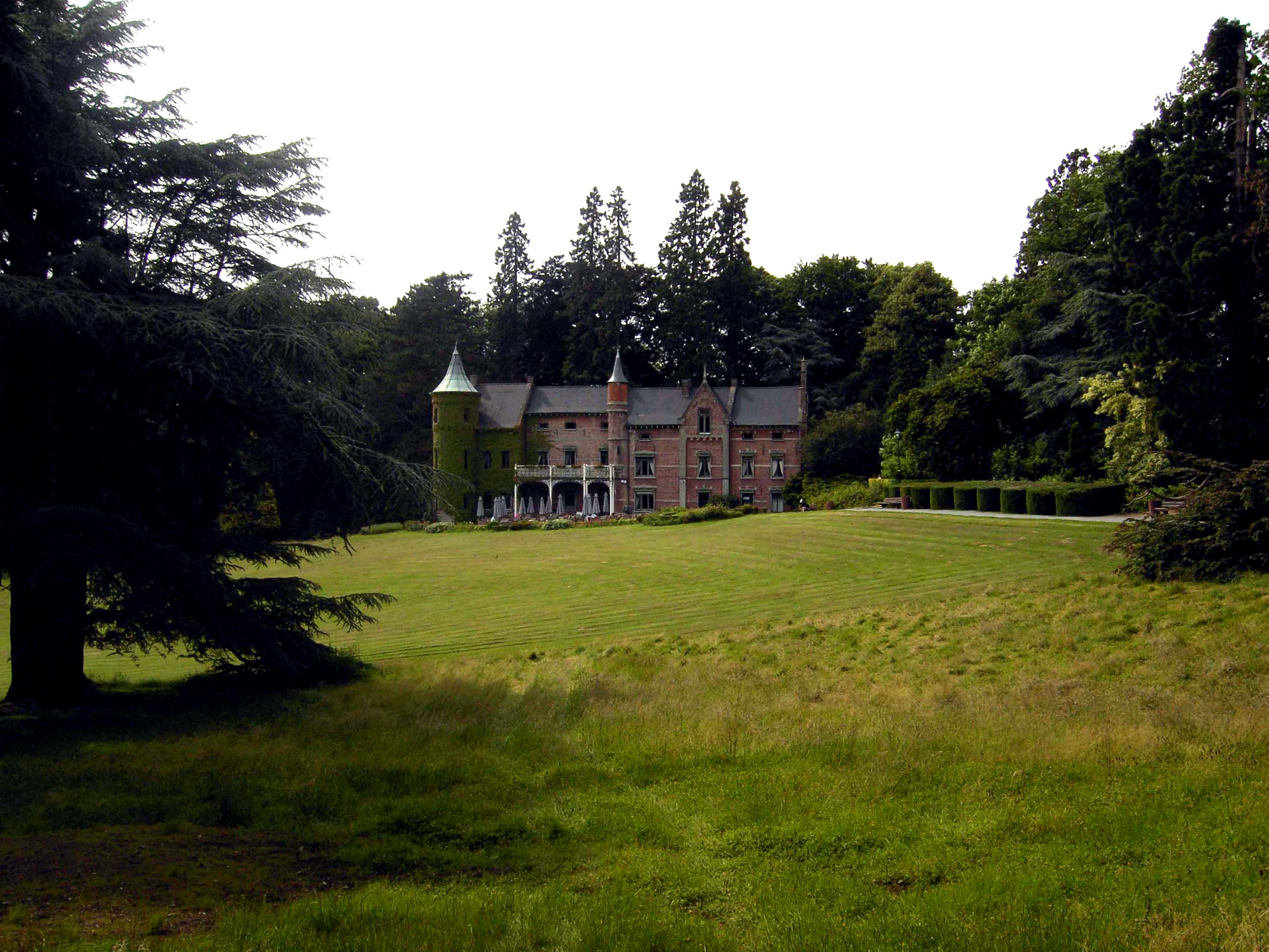
- Breivelde Castle and Domain of Breivelde (2008)

- Location in Belgium
- Coordinates: 50.87223°N 3.83246°E
- Country: Belgium
- Region: Flemish Region
- Province: East Flanders
- Municipality: Zottegem

Area
  - Total: 5.07 km^{2} (1.96 sq mi)

Population (2021)
  - Total: 1,835
  - Density: 362/km^{2} (937/sq mi)
- Time zone: CET

Grotenberge is a village belonging to the municipality of Zottegem. It is located on the Molenbeek and the Molenbeek-Ter Erpenbeek within the Denderstreek and the Flemish Ardennes, the hilly southern part of the East Flanders province, Belgium.

Grotenberge is known for the Domain of Breivelde, a 19th-century large garden, turned into a romantic style park with an arboretum. The park also hosts a castle. Construction started in 1830, the current state dates from around 1879. In 1970, the domain was bought by the city of Zottegem, and has received a protected state in 1982.

The village was first mentioned as Grothemberge in 1235. It became an independent municipality in the 18th century, but merged into Zottegem in 1970. The former municipality covered an area of 4.66 square kilometres (1.80 sq mi).
