= Leeuwergem Castle =

Stately home in Leeuwergem, Belgium

Coordinates: 50.890°N 3.820°E

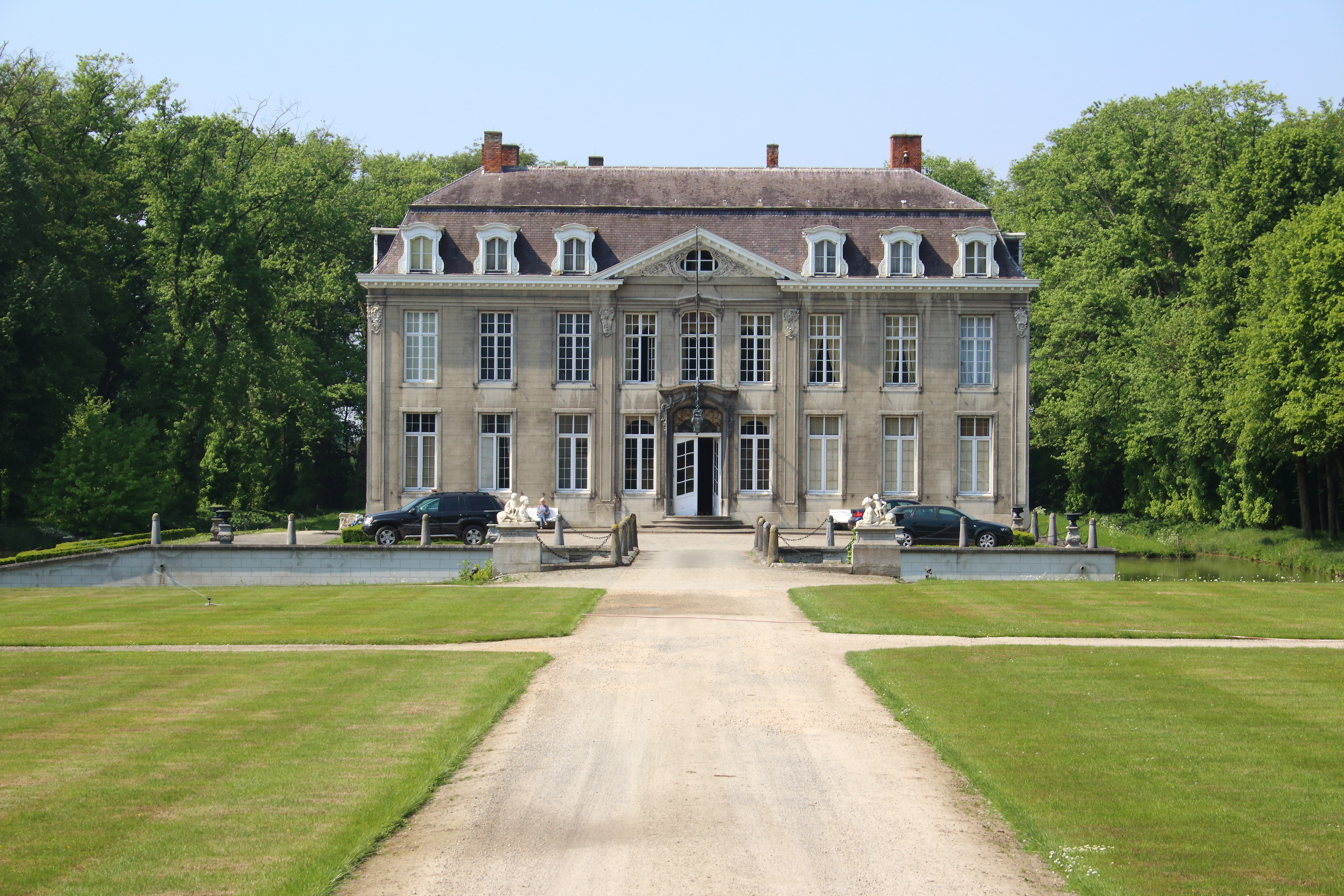
Leeuwergem Castle

Leeuwergem Castle (Dutch: Kasteel van Leeuwergem) is a stately home in the village of Elene in the municipality of Zottegem, East Flanders, Belgium.

== History ==
The present building was constructed between 1762 and 1764, on the site of an earlier castle of the first half of the 15th century. It was built for the Ghent nobleman Pieter Emmanuel d’Hane (1726–1786), probably by Jean Baptist Simoens of Ghent (1715–1779). The interior and exterior is in the French château style, as the estate was built after examples in France. Today the castle is private property of the house of della Faille d'Huysse.

== Gardens ==
The castle is known for its fine baroque gardens and hunting forest estate. The gardens were designed between 1763 and 1775. The gardens can be visited on request.

The 2016 film The Exception was filmed in the castle.

== See also ==
- List of castles in Belgium
