= Breivelde Castle =

Castle in Belgium

Coordinates: 50°52′19″N 3°49′51″E

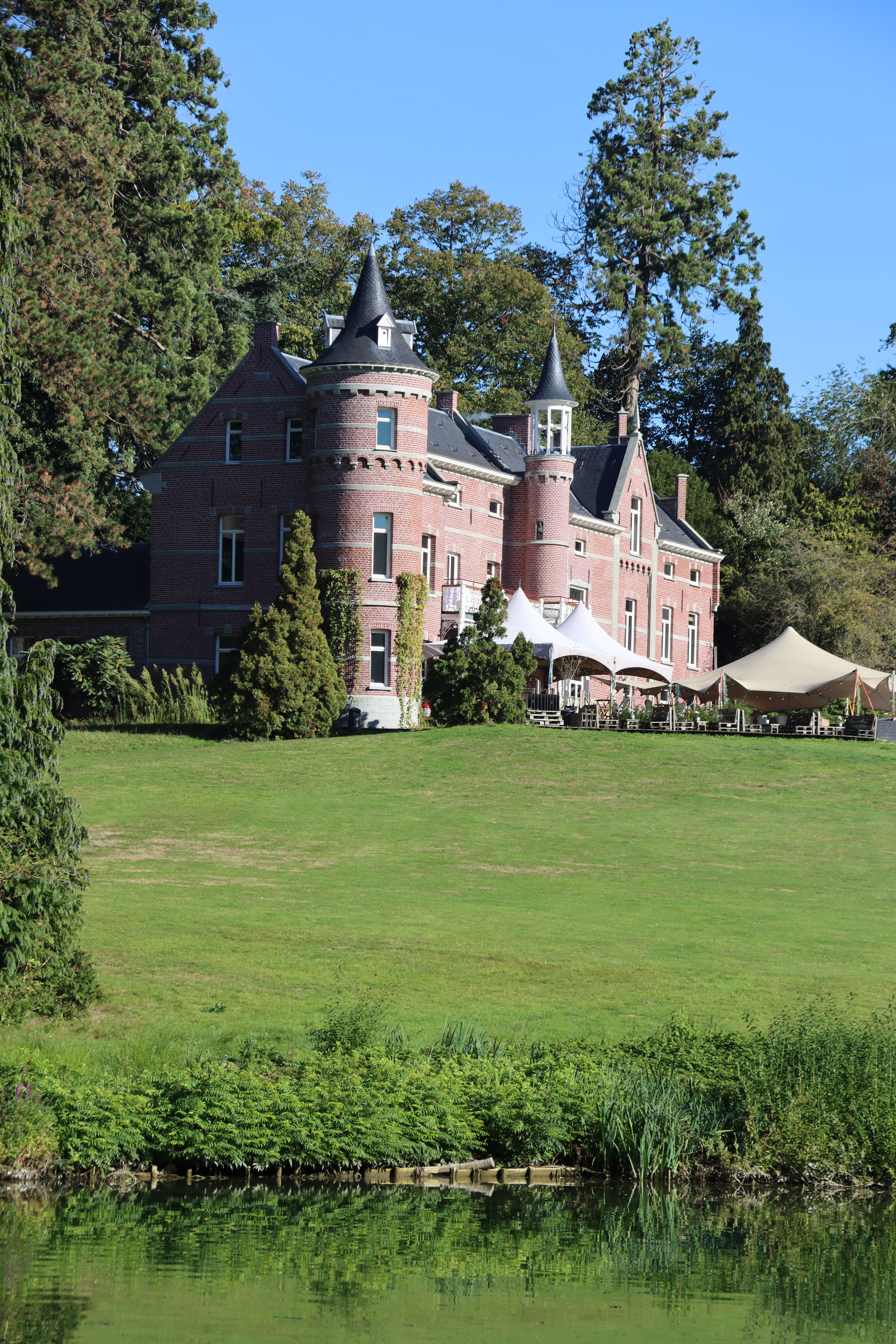
Breivelde Castle and Breivelde estate

Breivelde Castle (Dutch: Kasteel (van) Breivelde) and the surrounding park Breivelde estate (Domein Breivelde) is a castle in Grotenberge, Zottegem in Belgium. Breivelde castle was built in Renaissance Revival architecture in 1904 by owner Philippe Plancqaert van Exen van Beauvechain, replacing a mansion erected in 1871 by former owner August De Rouck. It is surrounded by a public English landscape garden containing ponds, cascades and exotic trees. The imitation river bend (created around 1852) mirrors the castle in its waters. Since 1971 the domain is open to the public. The castle underwent several restorations; a new restoration phase started after 2021. It is a heritage monument landscape since 1982.

== Images ==
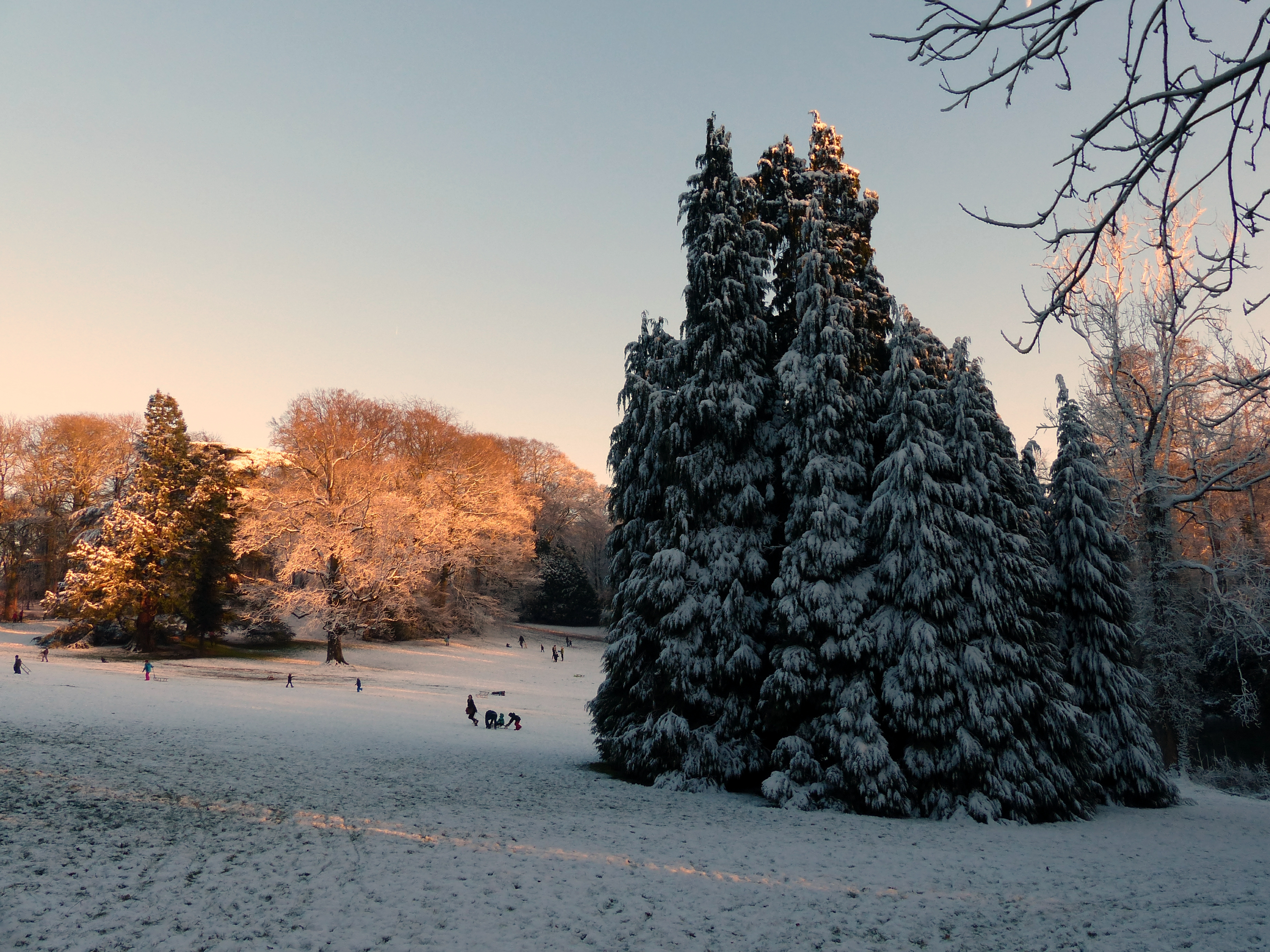

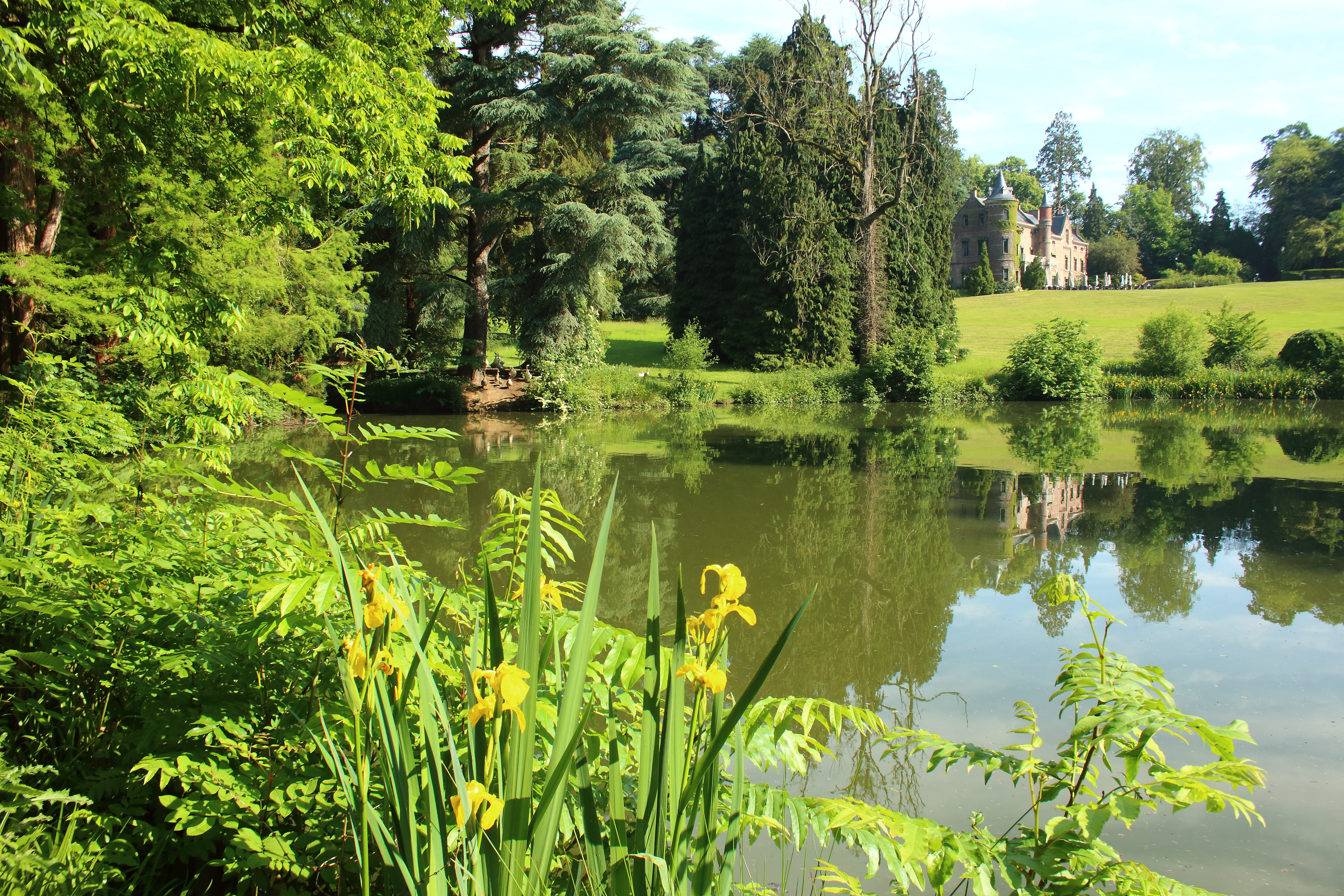

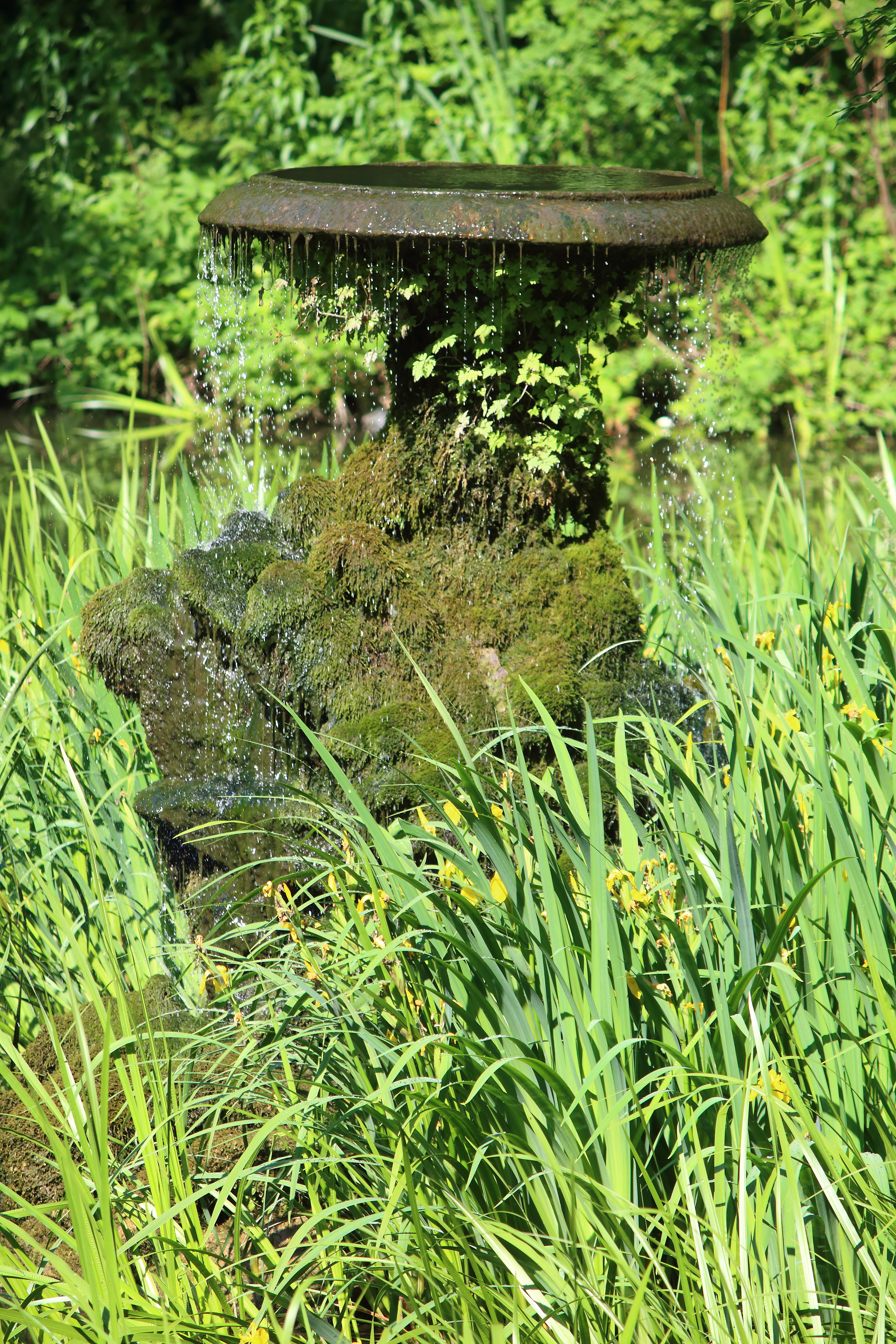

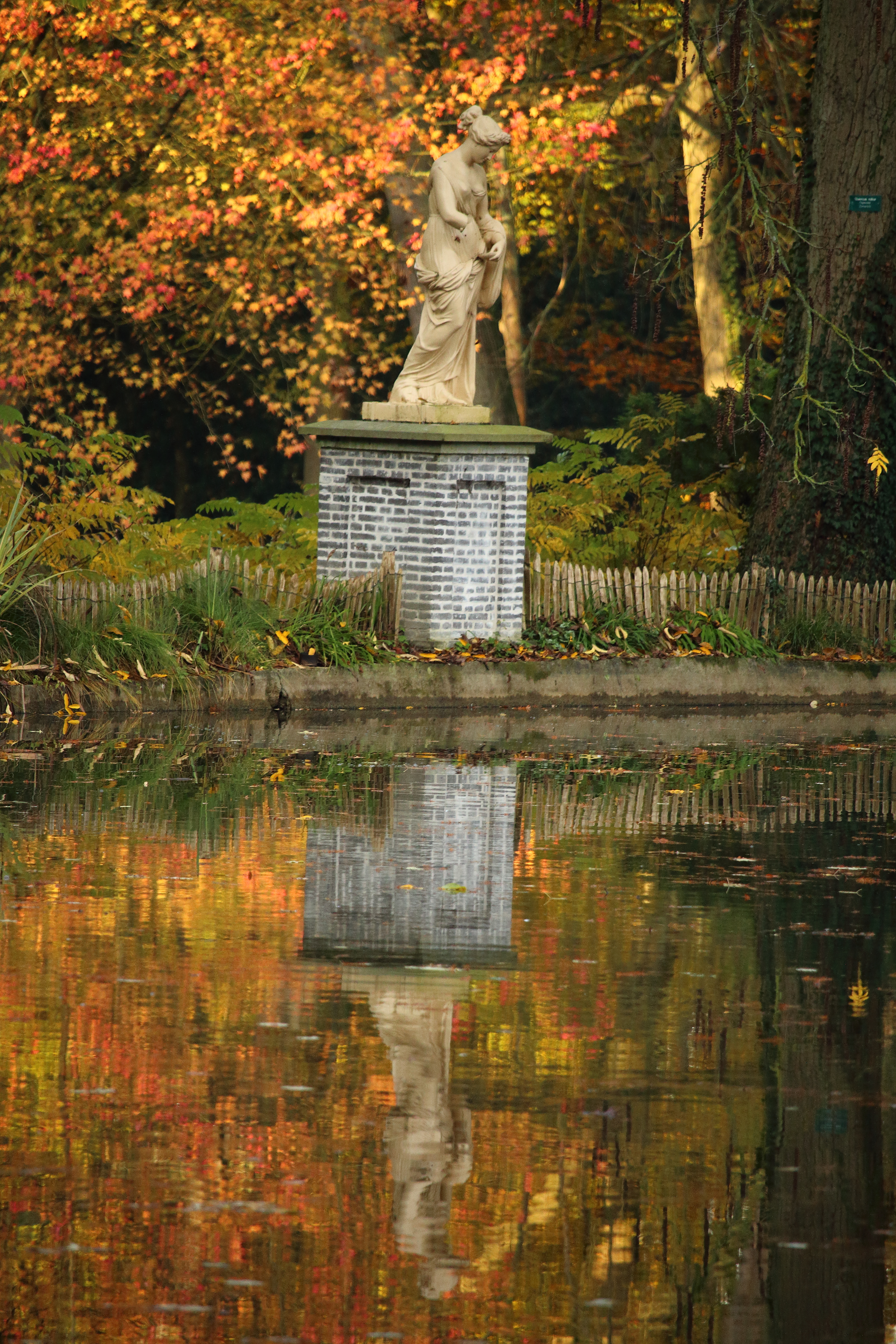

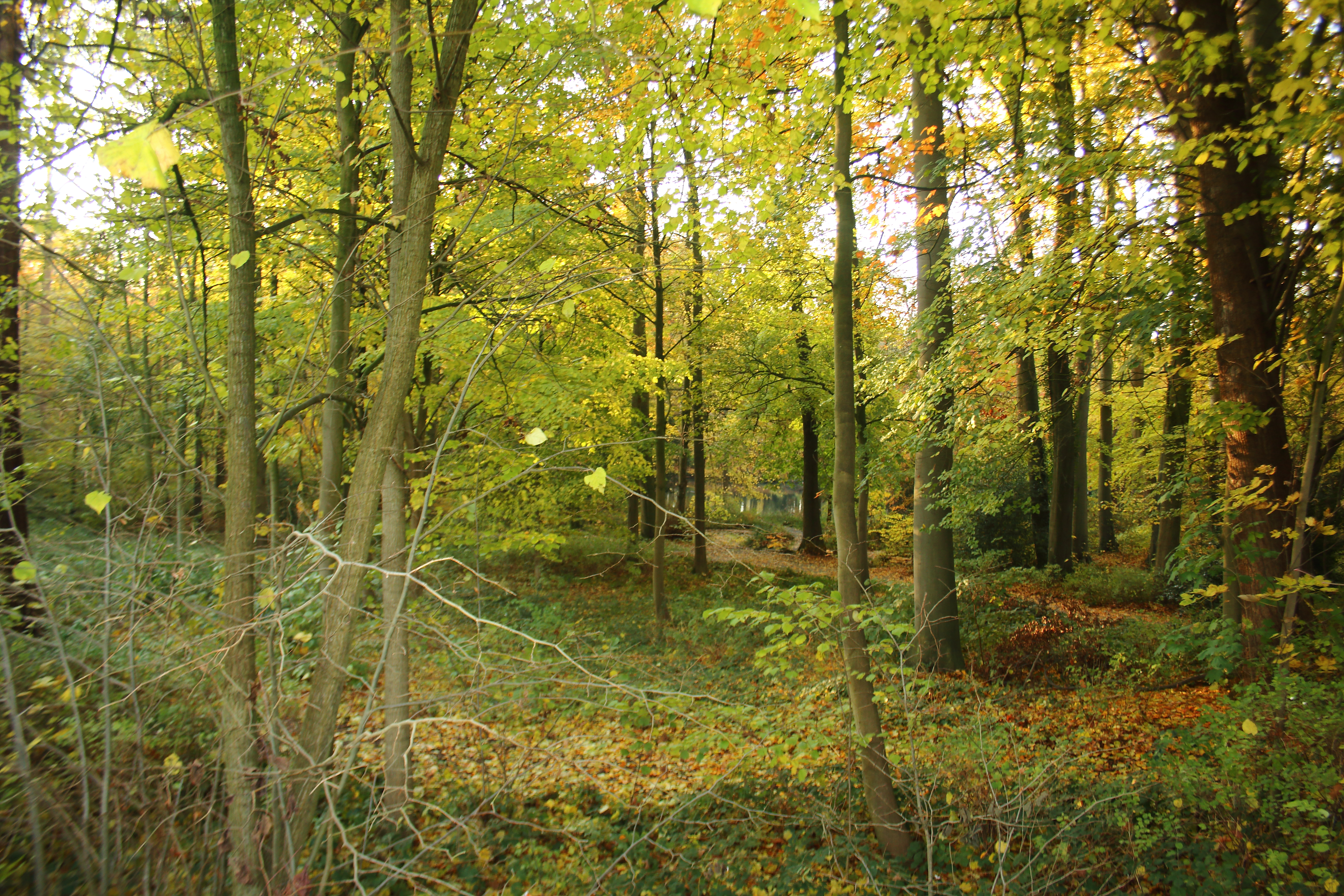

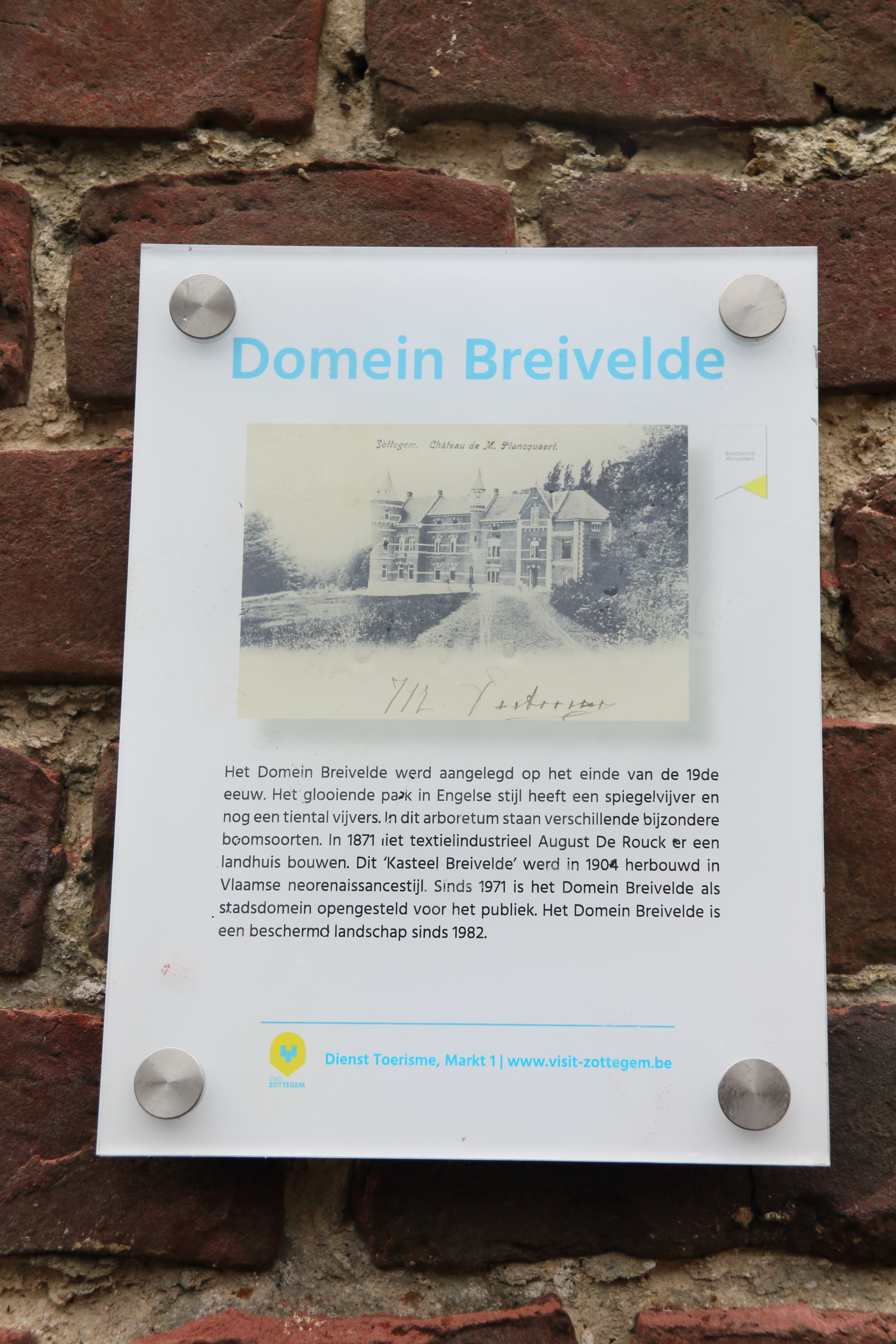

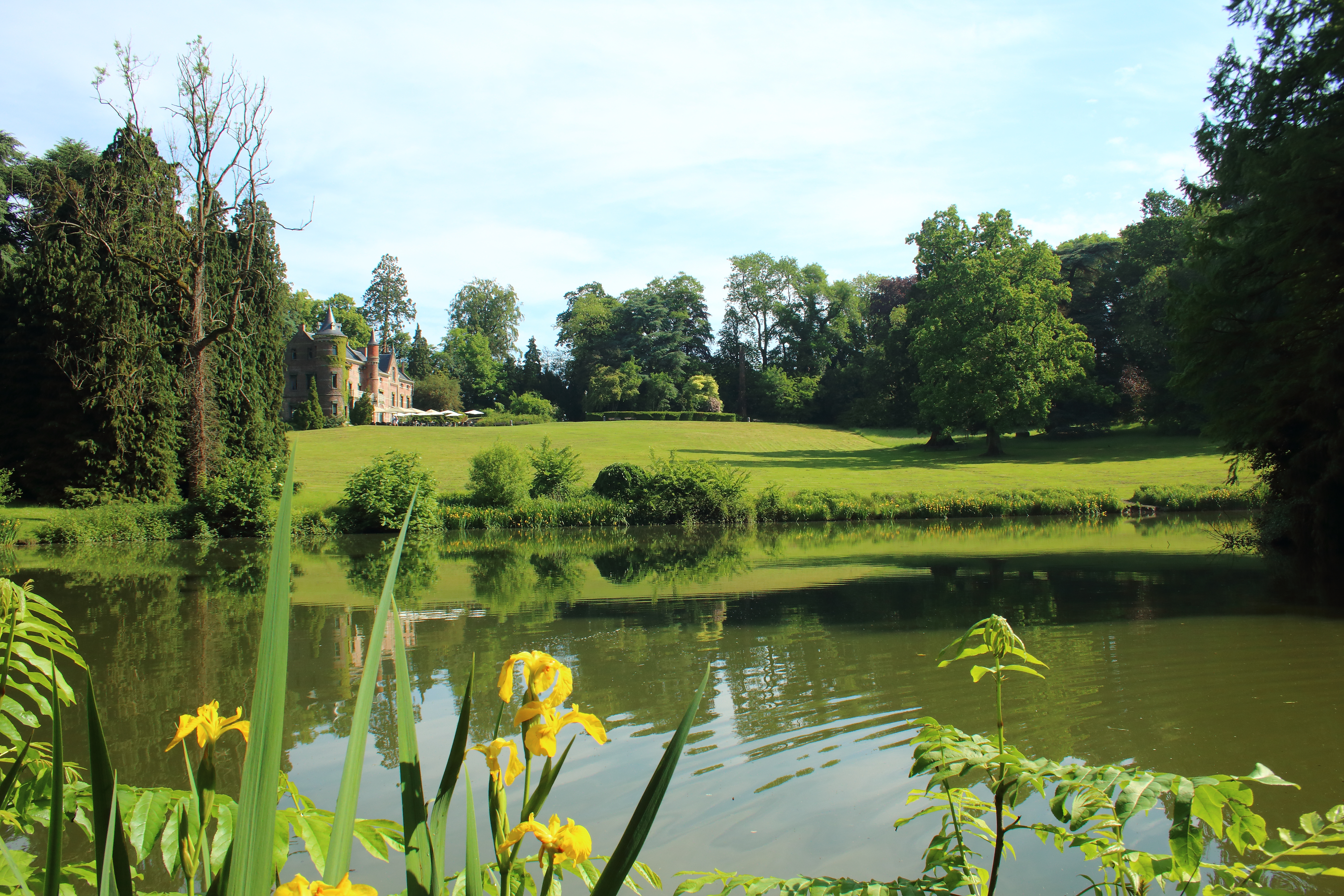

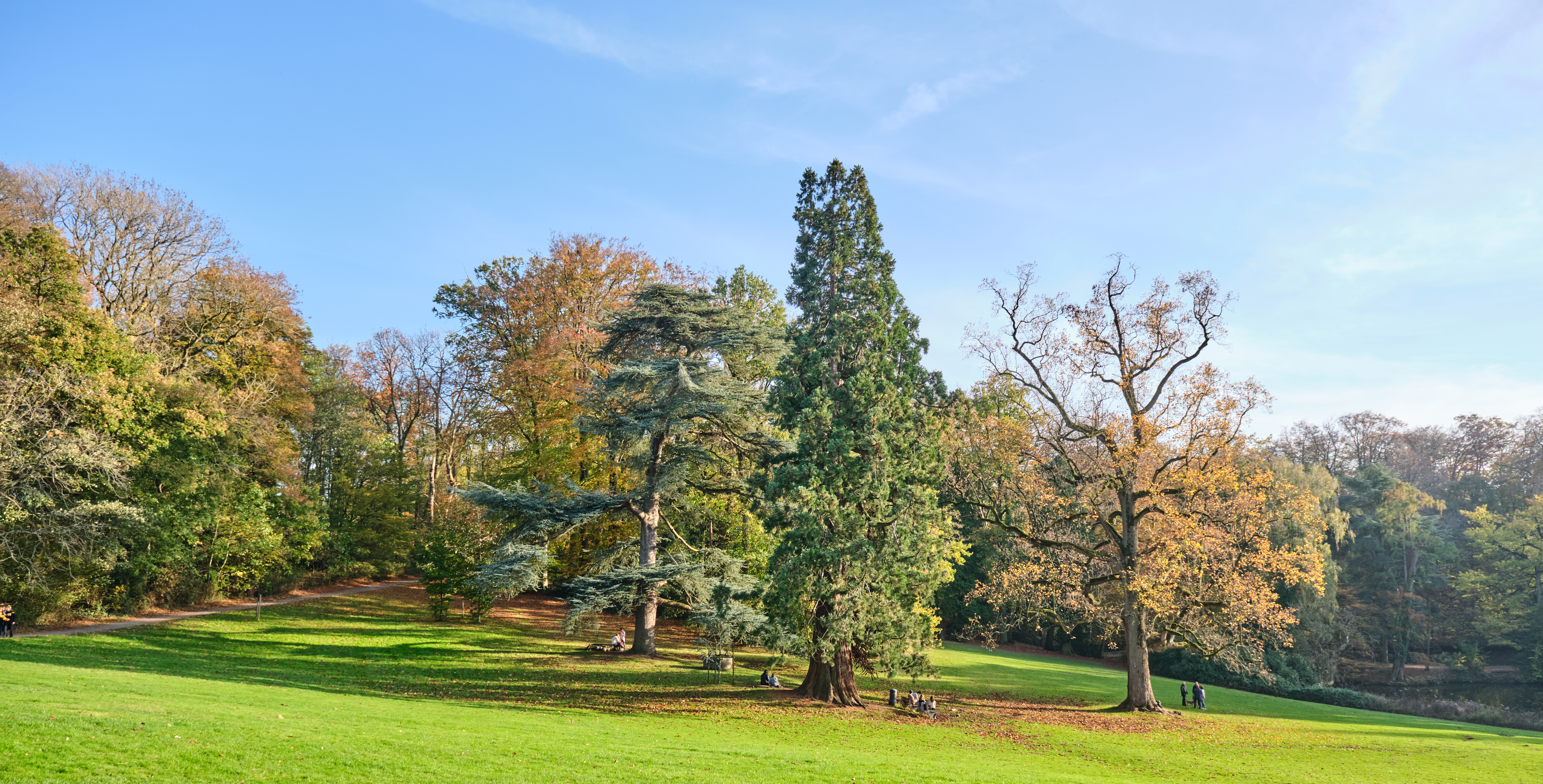
