= Erwetegem =

- Village
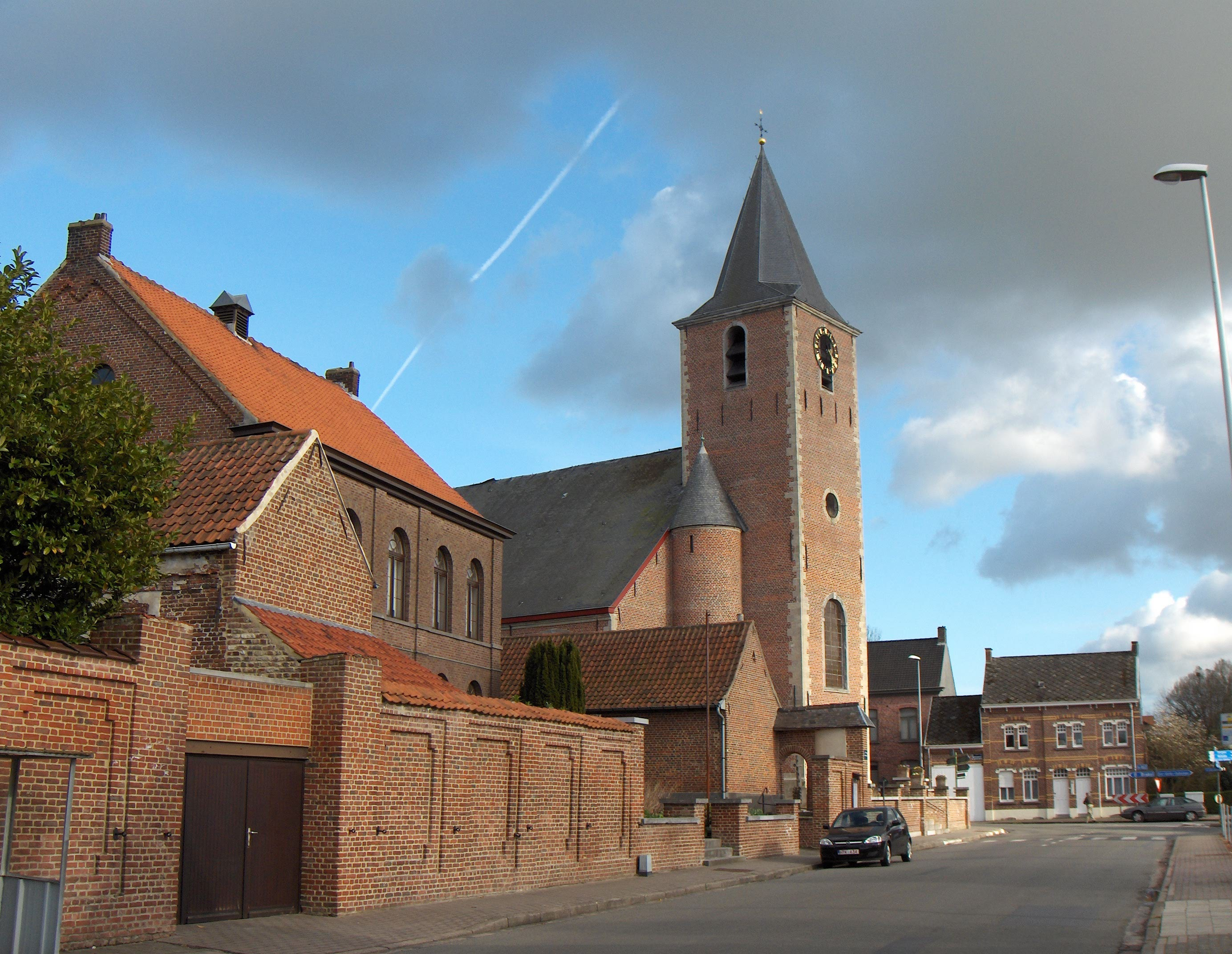
- St Pieters Banden Church

- Location in Belgium
- Coordinates: 50.8546°N 3.8150°E
- Country: Belgium
- Region: Flemish Region
- Province: East Flanders
- Municipality: Zottegem

Area
  - Total: 9.40 km^{2} (3.63 sq mi)

Population (2021)
  - Total: 3,128
  - Density: 333/km^{2} (862/sq mi)
- Time zone: CET

Erwetegem is a village and deelgemeente (sub-municipality) belonging to the municipality of Zottegem. It is located in the Denderstreek and in the Flemish Ardennes, the hilly southern part of the province of East Flanders, Belgium. Erwetegem used to be an independent municipality until 1970.

== History ==
The village was first mentioned in 1116 as Herwetengem. Saint Peter's Abbey in Ghent and the Abbey of Mont-Saint-Martin used to have many possessions in Erwetegem. Erwetegem used to be an independent heerlijkheid until the 13th century when it became part of the heerlijkheid of Zottegem.

The St Pieters Banden Church was first mentioned in 1162. The current church dates from dates 1779 and is a three aisled brick and sandstone stone. In 2022, stones fell off the tower even though the church had been restored several decades ago. Near the church there is a memorial for the military and cilivian casualties during World War I and II.

The highest point in Zottegem used to contain a grist mill from 1728. On 9 November 1914, the Germans arrived in Erwetegem and discovered that you could see all the way to Ghent from the windmill. Therefore, the windmill was blown up with dynamite to prevent it being used as observation point.

The monastery of the Dominican Sisters was built in 1906, and used to contain a school and orphanage. During World War II, it was used as temporary refuge for weakened Jewish girls. After the war, it became a sanatorium for weakened children. The monastery was sold in 1991, and contains several organisations as well as a training and congress centre.

Erwetegem was an independent municipality until 1970, when it was merged into Zottegem.

== Gallery ==
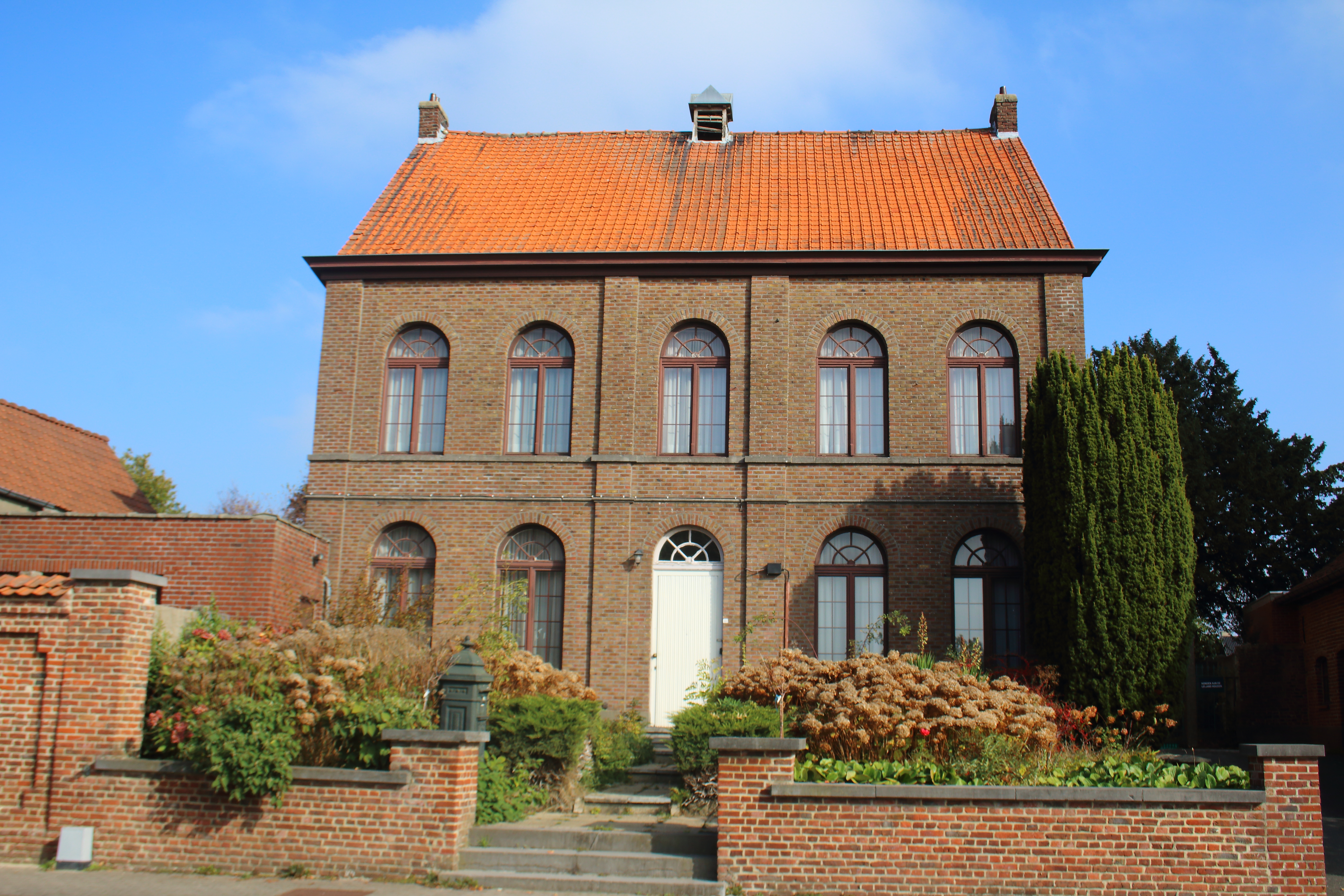
Clergy house

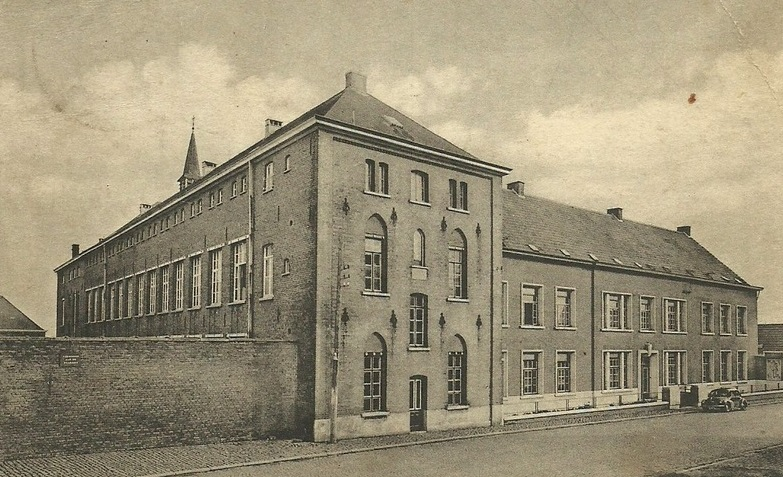
Former monastery Erwetegem

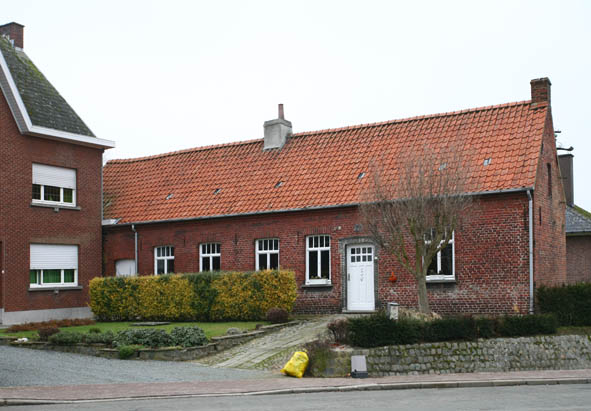
House in Erwetegem

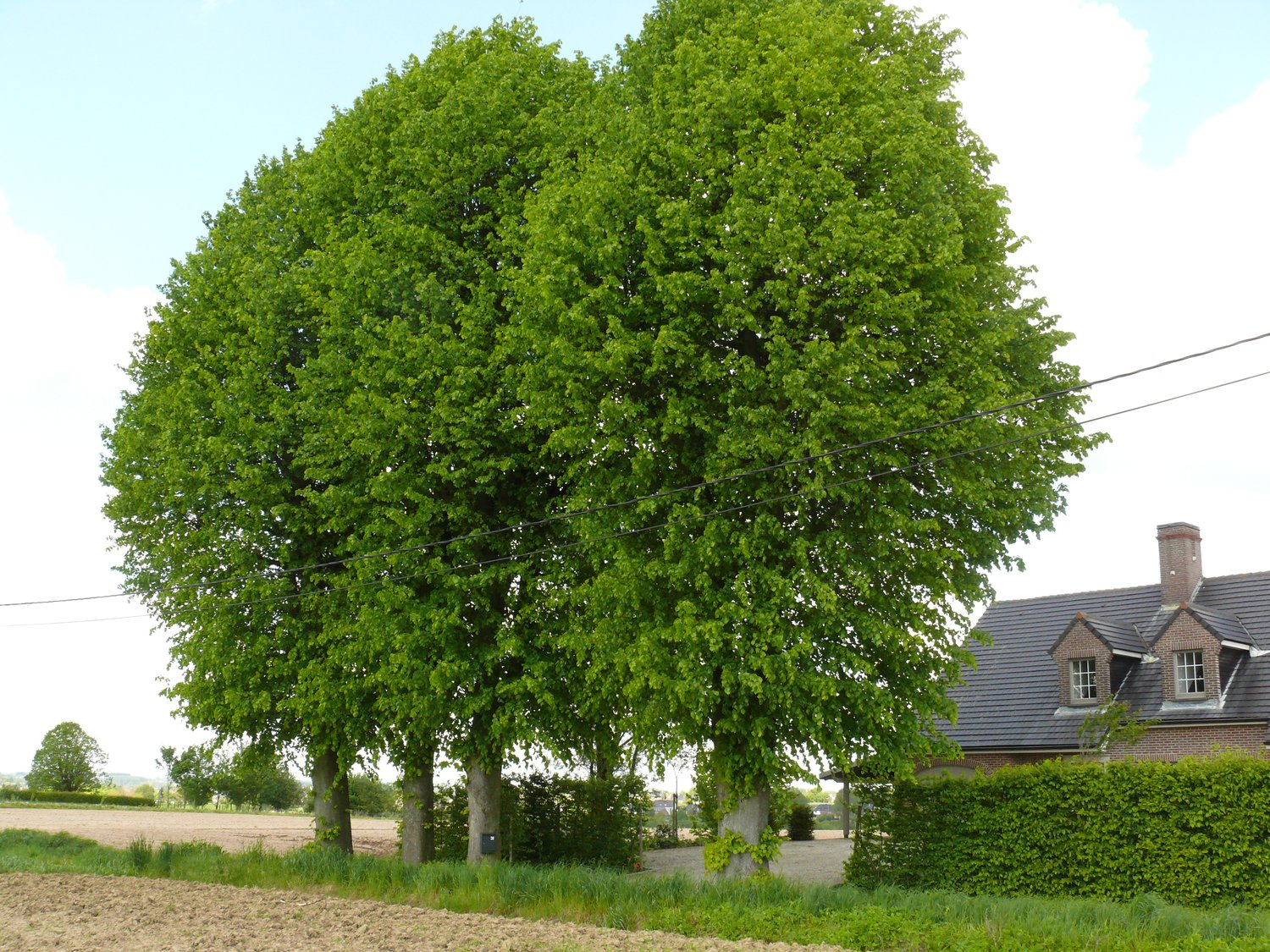
Tilia trees
