= Philip de Lalaing =

Philip de Lalaing was the name of three noblemen who were politically influential in the 16th-century Low Countries:

- Philip de Lalaing, 2nd Count of Hoogstraten (died after 1555), Governor of Guelders
- Philip de Lalaing, Lord of La Mouillerie (1499–1550), Master of the Household to Margaret of Austria
- Philip de Lalaing, 3rd Count of Lalaing (1537–1582), Governor of Hainaut
