= De Lalaing family =

Flemish noble family

Lalaing (de)
- noble family
- Country: Holy Roman Empire County of Hainaut Habsburg Netherlands Spanish Netherlands Austrian Netherlands First French Empire; United Kingdom of the Netherlands Kingdom of Belgium
- Origin: County of Flanders
- Founded: ± 11th century
- Titles: Lords of Bugnicourt Lords of Culemborg; Lords of Escornaix; Lords of Montigny; Lords of Villers; Lords of Wavrin; Lords of Zandbergen; Barons of Arquennes; Counts of Lalaing; Counts of Hoogstraten; Counts of Rennenberg; Counts of Tildonck; Viscount of Audenaerdee Marquesses of Renty
- Motto: Sans Reproche
- Estates: Counties of Lallaing, Hoogstraten and Renneberg. Baronies of Montigny, Escornaix. Lordships of Hantes and Bugnicourt. Château de Forest-sur-Marque, Château de Lallaing, Château d'Écaussinnes-Lalaing, Château d'Audenarde, Château d'Hoogstraten, Château de Lalaing

The Lalaing family is an ancient aristocratic family from the south of Flanders (Lallaing is currently in France), whose members played an important role in the history of the County of Hainaut and of the Netherlands. The current family belongs to the Belgian nobility.

== History ==
The first known ancestor is Gerard de Forest who lived in the 11th century. Thanks to the wedding of Philipp of Lalaing, 2nd Count of Hoogstraten to Anne Countess of Renneberg, daughter of William, count of Rennenberg and Anne of Culemborg, their descendants inherited multiple important lands and titles.

== Family Tree ==
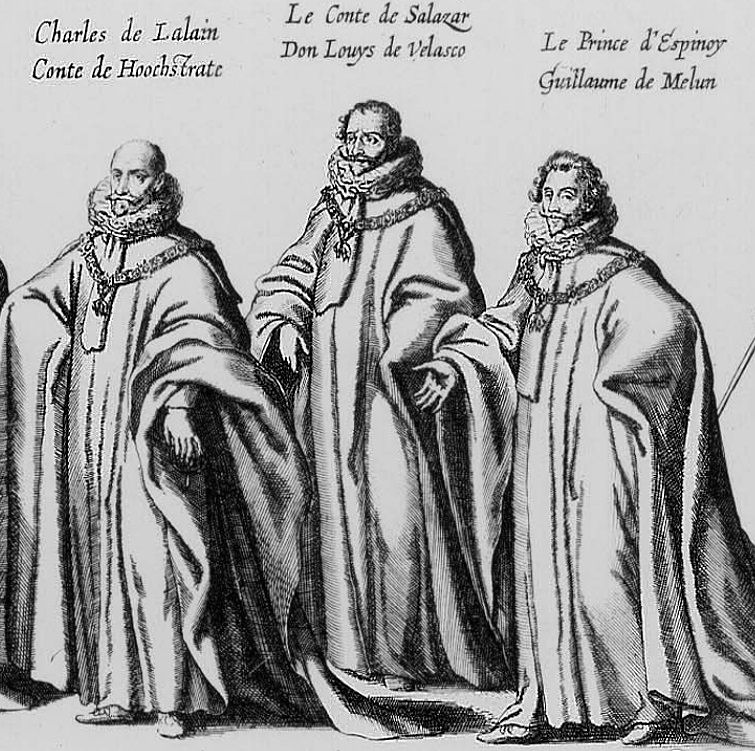
the Count of Hoogstraeten during the Funeral of Albert VII, Arcduke

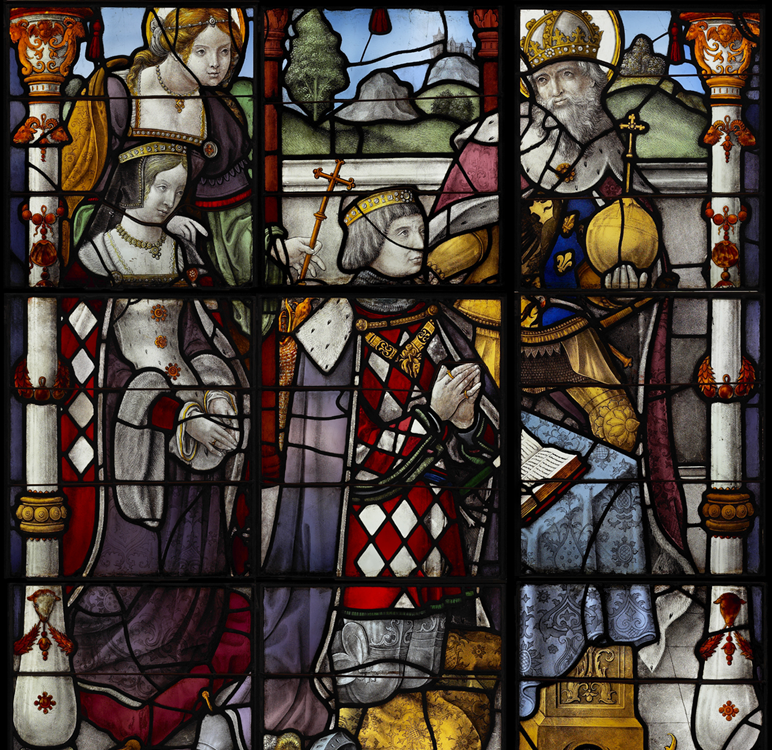
Charles, Count of Hoogstraeten

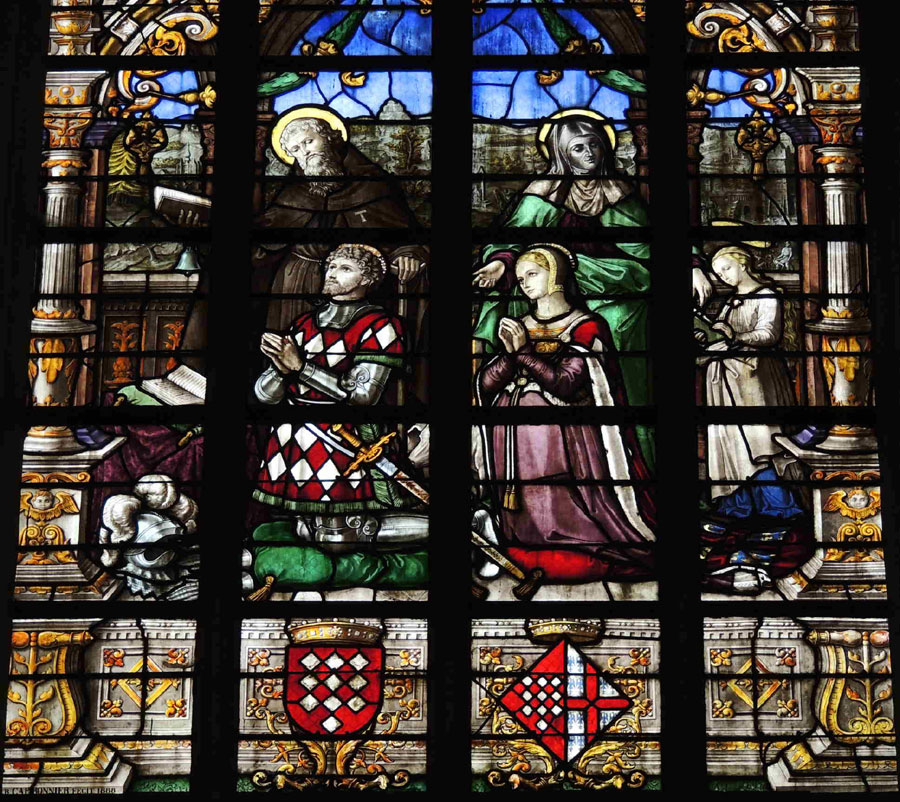
Antoine II de Lalaing, 3rd Count of Hoogstraeten and Eleonore of Montmorency

=== Descendants of Othon ===
Othon, Lord of Lalaing;
Married to Yolande of Barbançon, Lady of Montigny

  - Simon de Lalaing (1405–1476): Knight of the Golden Fleece.
    married to Jeanne de Gavre, lady of Escornaix
    - Joost de Lalaing (-1483): Lord of Montigny
      married to Bonne de Viefville
      - Charles I, 1st Count of Lalaing (1466–1525)
        married to Jacqueline de Luxembourg
        - Charles II, 2nd Count of Lalaing (1506–1558)
          m.1 Marguerite de Croÿ (1508–1549) m.2 Marie de Montmorency (-1570)
          - Philip de Lalaing, 3rd Count of Lalaing:
            married to Marguerite de Ligne-Arenberg (1552–1611)
            - Christine of Lalaing;
              married to Maximillian; count of Bailleul, Baron of Lesdain
              - Marguerithe of Bailleul:
                Married to Ambroise de Hornes, count of Bassignies.
                - Eugene Maximilian, Prince of Hornes
            - Maria Margaretha de Lalaing (1574–1650) m. Florent of Berlaymont (1550–1626)
          - Emanuel Philibert de Lalaing (1557–1590) m. Anne de Croÿ (-1608)
          - Marie-Christine de Lalaing (-1582)
            m. Pierre de Melun (1594)
        - Philip de Lalaing, 2nd Count of Hoogstraten (-1555)
          m. Anna von Rennenberg
          - Antoine II, 3rd Count of Hoogstraten (1533–1568): see below.
          - George de Lalaing, Count of Rennenberg; Marquess of Ville (-1581)
      - Antoine I de Lalaing (1480–1540); 1st Count of Hoogstraeten:
        Married to Elisabeth van Culemborg (1475–1555)
  - Guillaume of Lalaing,
    Married to Jeanne of Crequy.
    - Yolande of Lalaing:
      married to Reinoud II van Brederode, lord of Vianen
      - Walraven II van Brederode
    - Jacques de Lalaing: Knight of the Golden Fleece.

=== Descendants of the 3rd Count of Hoogstraeten ===
Antoine II de Lalaing, 3rd Count of Hoogstraeten(1533–1568)
Married to Eleonore de Montmorency

  - Guillaume de Lalaing, 4th Count of Hoogstraeten;
    married to Marie-Christine of Egmont, daughter of the Prince of Gavere.
    - Antoine III of Lalaing, 5th Count of Hoogstraeten;
      Married to Marguerite of Berlaymont - No children-
  - Charles de Lalaing, 6th Count of Hoogstraeten: Knight of the Golden Fleece and of Saint-James.
    Married to Alexandrine de Langlee.
    - Albert-François de Lalaing, 7th Count of Hoogstraeten
      - Marie-Gabriel de Lalaing; 8th Countess of Hoogstraeten.
  - Philippe de Lalaing, Baron of Nevele; Canon at the Cathedral of Liège

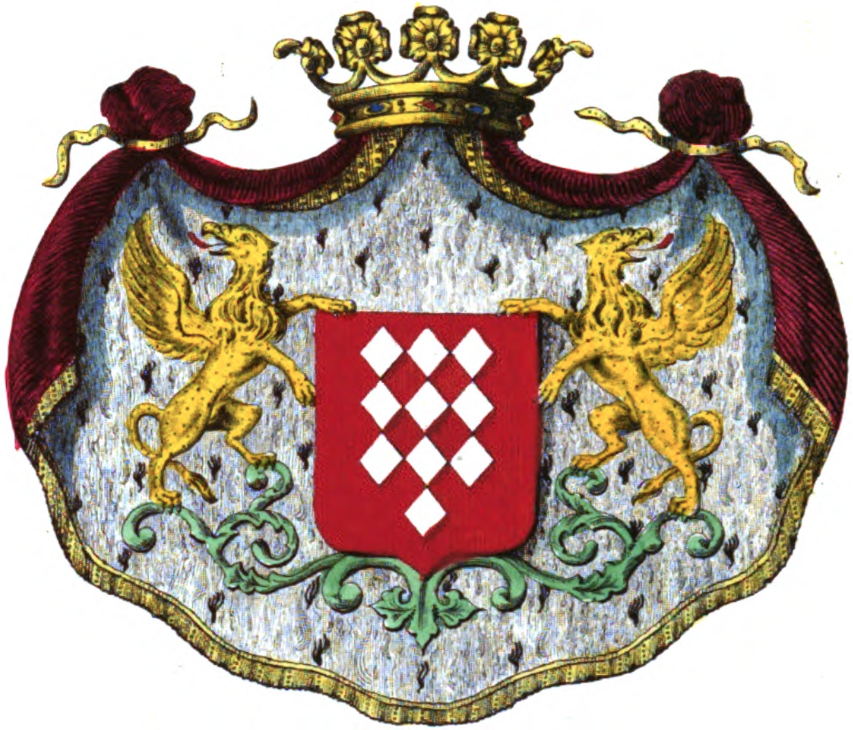
Full achievement of the arms of the Lalaing family.

=== Viscounts of Audenaerde ===
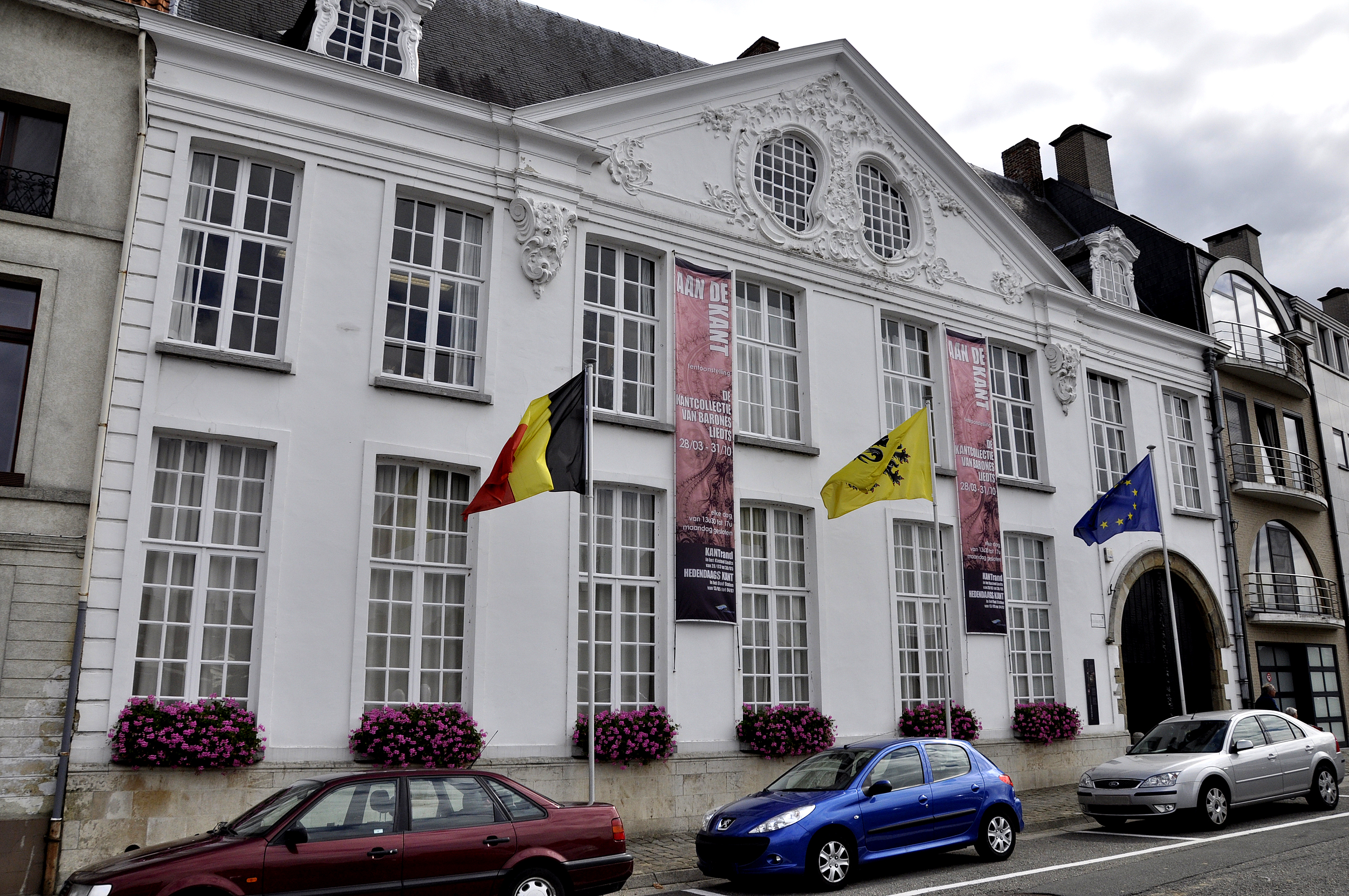
The Residence of the Viscount of Oudenaerde, 17th century facade

This legitimated branch of the family descends from Antoine I de Lalaing. They resided between the 15th and 17th century in the House of Lalaing, Oudenaarde. It is believed to be the birthplace of Margaret of Parma.

Philip de Lalaing, Lord of La Mouillerie
married to Florentia Rechem, Lady of Audenaerde.

  - Jacques I de Lalaing, 5th Viscount of Audenaerde;
    married to Marie, lady of Enghien.
    - Philippe de Lalaing, 6th Viscount of Audenaerde;
      died without heirs.
    - Charles I de Lalaing, 7th Viscount of Audenaerde;
      married to Catherine de Fourneau.
      - Ferry de Lalaing, 8th Viscount of Audenaerde;
        married to Marie-Anne van der Noot
        - Jacques II de Lalaing, 9th Viscount of Audenaerde;
          married to Maria Therese Rym, granddaughter of Simon Rodriguez de Evora, 1st Baron of Rode.
          - Maximilien-Joseph, 1st count of Lalaing, 10th Viscount of Audenaerde;

=== Counts of Lalaing-Thildoncq ===
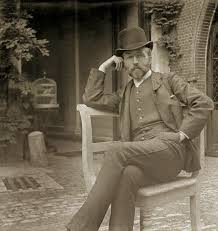
Jacques de Lalaing son of Maximilien III de Lalaing

Maximilien I Joseph, count de Lalaing, 10th Viscount of Audenaerde (+1756);
married to Marie-Catherine de Larchier, Countess of Thildoncq

  1. Charles II Joseph, count de Lalaing, 11th Viscount of Audenaerde and Count of Thildoncq,
    Married to Marie Camille de Beer.
    1. Maximilien II Charles Count de Lalaing, 12th Viscount of Audenaerde, Count of Thildoncq;
      married to Anne-Marie de Draeck.
      1. Charles III Joseph Count de Lalaing, 1st Baron of Arquennes, (1768-1816)
        married to Henriette de Maldeghem
        1. Maximilien III Count de Lalaing (1811-1881)
          1. Charles Maximilien Count de Lalaing (1857-1919); diplomat.
          2. Jacques Count de Lalaing; sculptor
  2. Eugène-François de Lalaing d'Audenaerde; Lord Chamberlain of the Archduchess.
    married to Agatha-Sohia de Espegrac.
    1. Charles Eugène de Lalaing d'Audenarde; General; knight grand Cross of the Legion of Honour;
      married to Julienne, Countess Dupuy

=== Current head branch ===
The current family moved back to Belgium.

Charles Maximilien Count de Lalaing (1857-1919); diplomat.

  1. Jacques III Count de Lalaing (1889-1969); Secretary and ambassador of the King.
    1. Josse Count de Lalaing (1927-2019)
      1. Jacques IV Count de Lalaing (°1970);
        married to Lavinia Countess von Walburg zu Wolfegg und Waldsee.
  2. Maximilian Count de Lalaing (1893-1894)
  3. Isabella Countess de Lalaing (1896-1929); married to Gustave de Mévius.

== See also ==
- Belgian nobility
