= Charles II de Lalaing =

Dutch politician (1506-1558)

Charles II, 2nd Count of Lalaing
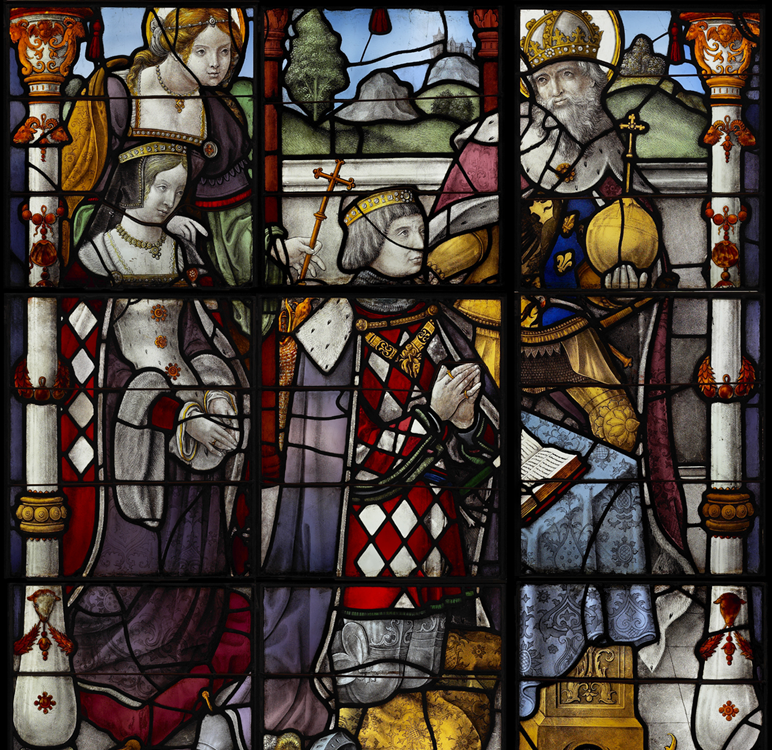
- Charles de Lalaing and Margaret of Croÿ at prayer, with their patron saints Charlemagne and Saint Margaret of Scotland (stained glass window in the church of Hoogstraten)

- Coat of arms
- Born: 1506; Lallaing?, County of Hainaut, Habsburg Netherlands
- Died: 23 November 1558 (aged 51–52); Brussels, Duchy of Brabant, Habsburg Netherlands
- Buried: Church of St Aldegonde, Lallaing
- Noble family: House of Lalaing
- Spouses: (1) Margaret of Croÿ, (2) Marie de Montmorency
- Father: Charles I de Lalaing
- Mother: Jacoba of Luxembourg

Charles II of Lalaing (1506 in Lallaing? – 23 November 1558 in Brussels) was Count of Lalaing, Lord of Escornaix and stadtholder of the County of Hainaut.

== Family ==
He was the eldest son of Charles I de Lalaing (died 1525) and Jacqueline of Luxemburg-Fiennes (died 1511), and succeeded his father as second Count of Lalaing. His younger brother was Philip de Lalaing, 2nd Count of Hoogstraten, who became Stadtholder of Guelders, Zutphen and Jülich.

Charles married on August 30, 1528 with Margaret of Croÿ (died 1549), daughter of Charles I of Croÿ-Chimay. They had 13 children of which 12 died young, except :

- Philip de Lalaing (1537-1582), Lord of Escornaix and also stadtholder of Hainaut.

After Margaret's death, Charles remarried in 1550 with Marie of Montmorency. They had 4 children :

- Hughes de Lalaing, Lord of Condé (1551–1618)
- Charles de Lalaing (died 1553)
- Emanuel Philibert de Lalaing, Lord of Montigny and Margrave of Renty (1557–1590)
- Philippe-Christine de Lalaing, also known at Marie-Christine de Lalaing (died 1582)

== Career ==
In 1531, at the age of 25, Charles became a Knight in the Order of the Golden Fleece. In 1534–35 he took part in Charles V's Tunis Campaign. He also served as one of the foremost commanders in the later stages of the Guelders Wars.

In 1540 Lalaing became a member of the Council of State (Raad van State) and in 1544 head of the Council of Finance. In 1549 he was appointed Governor and High Bailiff of the County of Hainaut. He remained governor until his death, but resigned as bailiff in 1556. When the Governor of the Netherlands, Emmanuel Philibert, Duke of Savoy, left for Italy in 1557 to fight the French in the Italian War of 1551–1559, Charles became his temporary substitute.

Preceded by Charles I de Lalaing	Count of Lalaing; 1525–1558	Succeeded by Philip de Lalaing
