= Charles de Lalaing, 6th Count of Hoogstraeten =

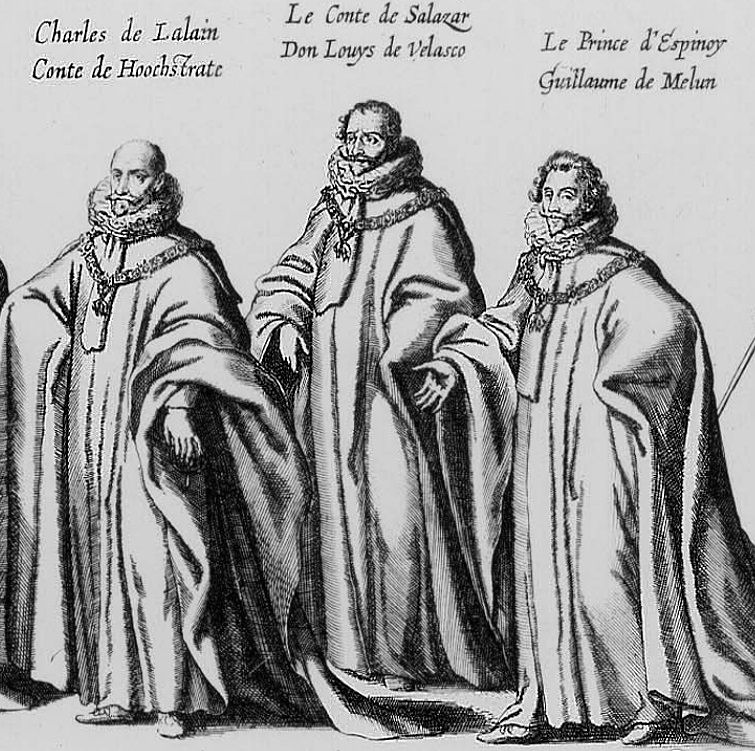
Charles during the funeral of Albert VII, Archduke, Brussels 1622

Charles de Lalaing, 6th Count of Hoogstraeten (died 1626) was a Flemish noble Lord from the House of Lalaing.

== Family ==
He was the son of Antoine II de Lalaing, 3rd Count of Hoogstraeten (1533–1568) and Eleonore de Montmorency. George de Lalaing, Count of Rennenberg was his uncle. He married Alexandrine de Langlee and was succeeded by his son Albert-François de Lalaing, 7th Count of Hoogstraeten.

During his life he was governor in service of the Spanish crown. He participated in the Solemn funeral of the archduke, as knight of the Golden Fleece; this honour was given to him in 1621.
