= Antoine de Lalaing =

Antoine de Lalaing or Antoon van Lalaing may refer to:

- Antoine I de Lalaing (1480–1540), 1st count of Hoogstraten and of Culemborg
- Antoine II de Lalaing (1533–1568), 3rd count of Hoogstraten
