= Johanna van der Gheynst =

Mistress of Charles V, Holy Roman Emperor

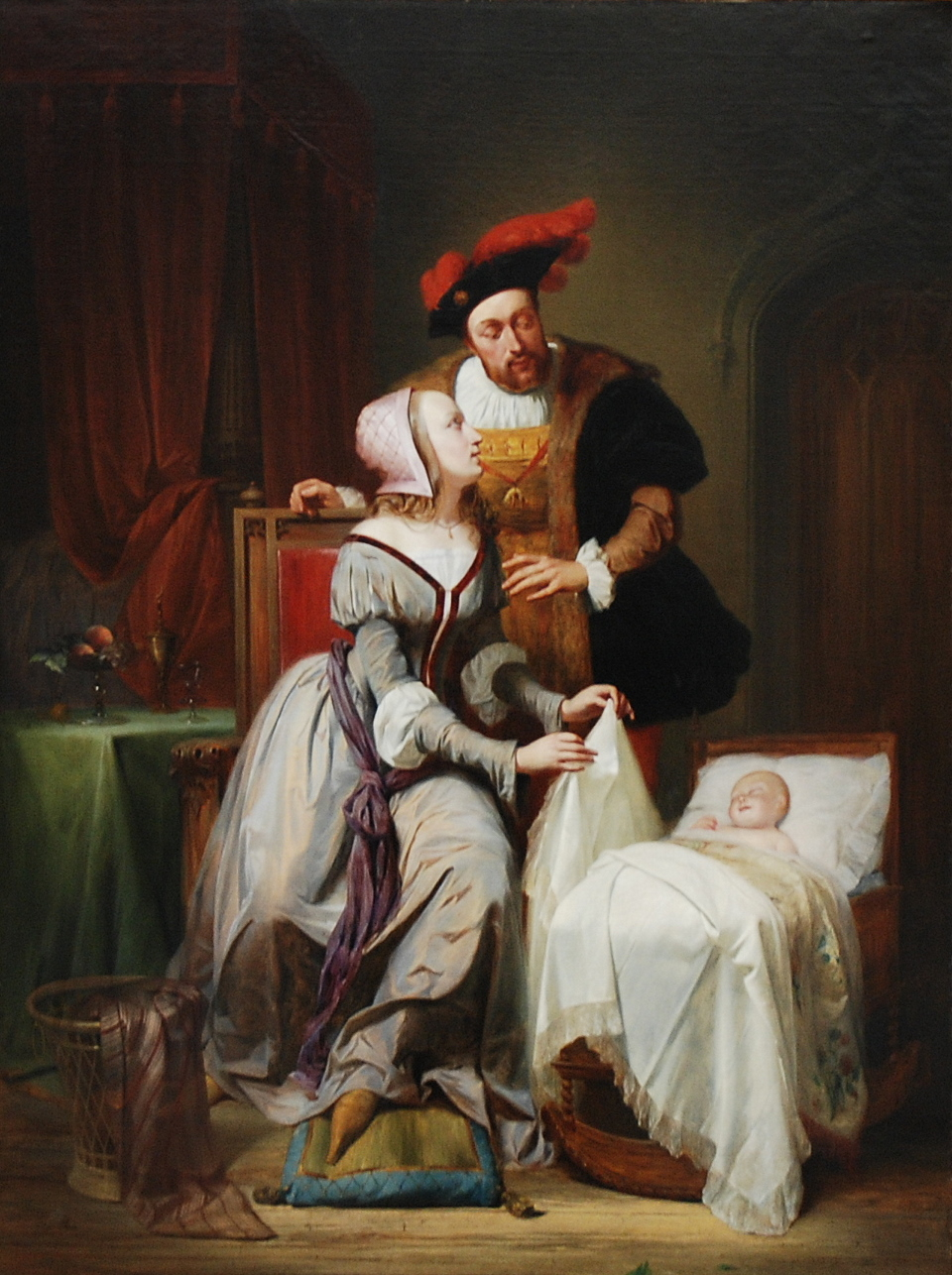
- Charles V with his mistress Johanna van der Gheynst at the cradle of their daughter Margaret of Parma, by Théodore-Joseph Canneel
- Born: c. 1500
- Died: 15 December 1541
- Spouse(s): Jean van den Dyke
- Father: Gilles Johan van der Gheynst
- Mother: Johanna van der Caye van Cocambi

Johanna Maria van der Gheynst (also called Jeanne Marie van der Gheynst, Johanna Maria van der Gheenst; c. 1505 - 15 December 1541) was briefly the mistress of Emperor Charles V in 1521-1522 and the mother of one of his daughters, Margaret of Parma. Margaret served as Governor of the Spanish Netherlands from 1559 to 1567 and from 1580 to 1583.

== Life ==
Johanna Maria van der Gheynst was the daughter of the carpet manufacturer Gilles Johan van der Gheynst and his wife Johanna van der Caye van Cocambi. Her parents lived at Nukerke near Oudenaarde. She entered the service of Charles I de Lalaing, Governor of Oudenaarde and Seigneur of Montigny.

The young Emperor Charles V met the beautiful Johanna when he visited the castle of the Seigneur of Montigny in autumn 1521. Their short affair produced a daughter who was named Margaret and put in the care of the De Douvrin family in Brussels. Charles V did not conceal his liaison with Johanna and in July 1529 he acknowledged Margaret as his daughter. Margaret would eventually become Governess-General of the Netherlands.

The Emperor granted Johanna van der Gheynst a modest pension. On 13 October 1525 she married Jean van den Dyke, a jurist and member of the Brabant Chamber of Accounts. The couple had several children. Johanna died in 1541, her husband on 1 September 1572.
