= Cornelia van Lalaing =

Dutch noblewoman

Cornelia van Lalaing (1545 - 1610), was a Dutch noblewoman, famous for the role she played in the so-called "Rennenberg Treason" in 1579 during the Eighty Year's War.

She was born to Philip van Lalaing, count of Hoogstraten (1510-1555) and Anna van Rennenberg (1510-1583), and married in 1576 to Willem van Hamal, baron de Monceau (1551-1582). She was the sister of George de Lalaing, count of Rennenberg, governor of Friesland, Groningen and Overijssel. Her family was Catholic, but originally supported the Protestant House of Orange-Nassau. In 1579, her brother was the only member of the family still loyal to William the Silent. the Prince of Orange, and his sudden and unexpected shift of side to the Catholics attracted great attention and became known as the "Rennenberg Treason". Cornelia van Lalaing visited her brother in 1579, and allegedly convinced him to change sides. History has given great attention to this, but there is no confirmation that she was indeed the cause of her brother's change of loyalty.
