= Charles I de Lalaing =

1st count of Lalaing, lord of Escornaix (1466–1525)

Charles I, 1st count of Lalaing
- Lalaing coat of arms
- Born: 1466
- Died: 18 July 1525
- Noble family: House of Lalaing
- Spouse: Jacoba of Luxembourg
- Father: Joost de Lalaing
- Mother: Bonne de La Viefville

Charles de Lalaing, baron and later 1st count of Lalaing, lord of Escornaix (1466 – Oudenaarde, July 18, 1525).

== Life ==
Charles was born as the eldest son of Joost de Lalaing, from a family of landowners from Hainaut. He was married to Jacoba of Luxembourg, daughter of Jacob of Luxembourg and Maria of Berlaymont. Their children were:

- Jacob, died on 29 October 1512 at the siege of Maisières
- Charles II, 2nd count of Lalaing
- Philip, 2nd count of Hoogstraten
- Anna, died after 1602, married to Everard of Pallant, count of Culemborg

== Political career ==
Charles was chamberlain to successively Maximilian of Austria, Philip the Fair and Charles V.

On 17 November 1505 he was made a Knight of the Order of the Golden Fleece (17th chapter, Middelburg).

From 1504 on he was governor of Oudenaarde. When Charles V spent six weeks at Charles of Lalaing's estates during the Siege of Tournai in 1521, he met Charles' servant Johanna van der Gheynst. As a consequence of the brief affair that ensued, the future regent Margaret of Parma was born.
