= Statue of Egmont =

Coordinates: 50°52′10″N 3°48′39″E

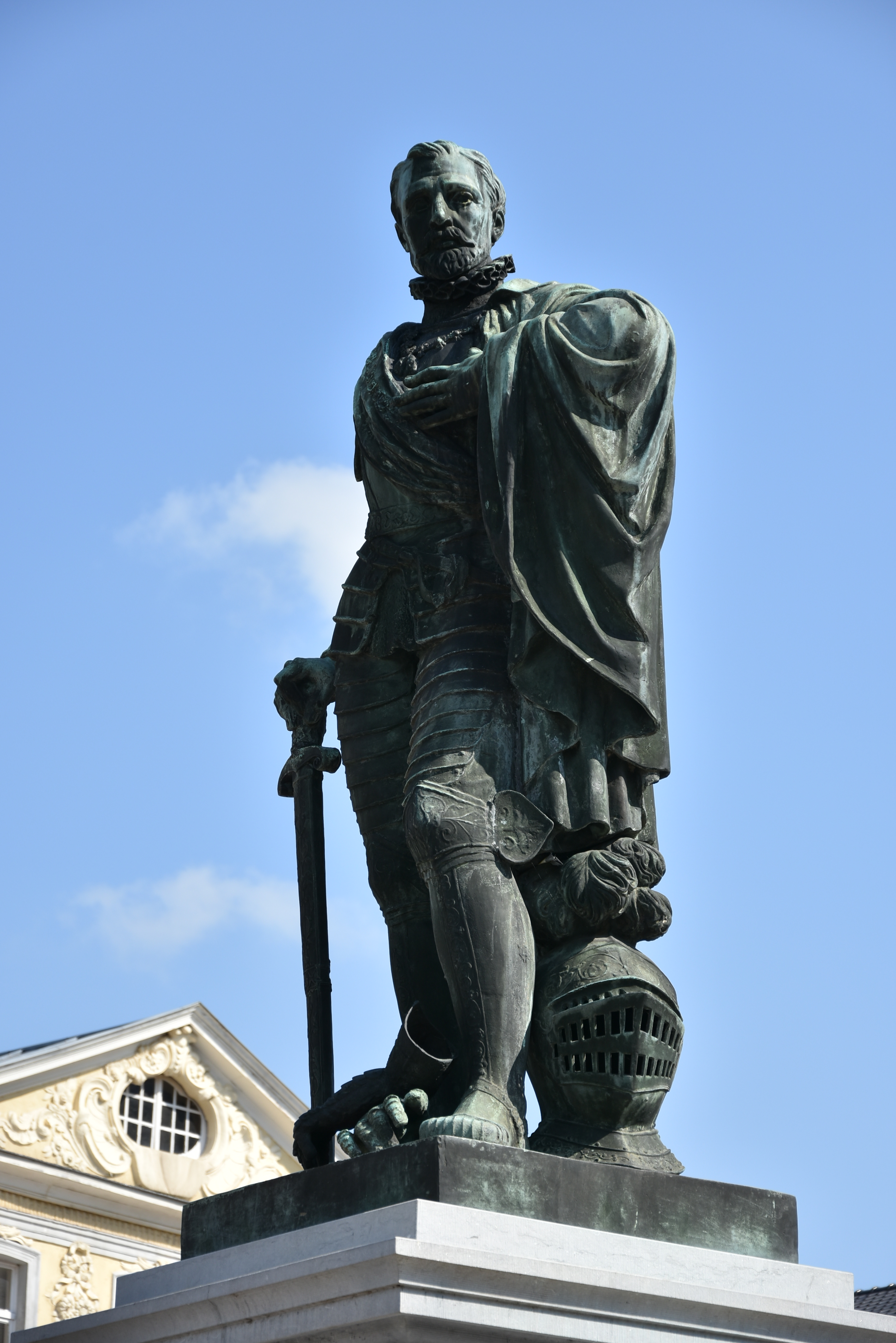
Statue of Egmont, market square, Zottegem

The Statue of Egmont (Dutch: Egmontstandbeeld or Standbeeld van (Lamoraal van) Egmont) is a statue of Lamoral, Count of Egmont in Zottegem, Belgium, dating from 1872.

Three identical statues exist: another bronze copy of the statue stands in Zottegem since 1968 and in 1997 a bronze copy was placed in the moat at Egmond Castle in Egmond aan den Hoef in the Netherlands.

== History ==
In 1814, the Zottegem city council started a campaign to erect a statue of Egmont on the central market square. In 1820, sculptor Jan-Robert Calloigne presented a plaster model of Egmont's statue at the Ghent Salon of the Royal Society of Fine Arts and Literature. In 1824, a plinth on the central square. In 1835, the literary society De Suyghelingen van Polus organised a poetry contest about Egmont, Winner Prudens van Duyse made a plea for a statue of Egmont. During the official opening of the newly built Egmont's crypt in 1857 Eugène Van Damme and Prudens van Duyse repeated their plea. The city of Zottegem bought the plaster model of the statue in 1862. In 1872, the statue was cast in wrought iron by Edmond Zégut in the French Usines de Tusey. On 14 April 1872, the statue was inaugurated. The text on the plinth reads: Lamoraal Graaf van Egmont, Heere van Sottegem, Heere van Gavere, Gouverneur van Vlaanderen en van Artesië, overwinnaar te Sint-Quintin 1557 en te Grevelingen 1558, onthoofd te Brussel den 5 juni 1568.

In 1968 (400 years after the beheading of Lamoral), the city thought the statue was too corroded, so a new bronze statue was made by Compagnie des Bronzes d'Art from Brussels. On 9 June 1968, the statue was officially inaugurated. The old wrought iron statue turned out not to be in such a bad state as previously thought, so it was transferred to Egmont Park in front of Egmont Castle.

In the 1990s, the Dutch town of Egmond aan den Hoef (cradle of the House of Egmont) got the idea of erecting a statue as well. In 1997, Dirk De Groeve from Hansbeke made a bronze copy of the statue in Zottegem. The statue was placed in the moat of Egmond Castle in Egmond aan den Hoef. It was inaugurated on 11 October 1997 by Josep Pons, the Spanish ambassador in the Netherlands. The text on the plinth reads: Lamoraal Graaf van Egmont 1522-1568, bedijker van de Egmondermeer 1565.

== Images ==
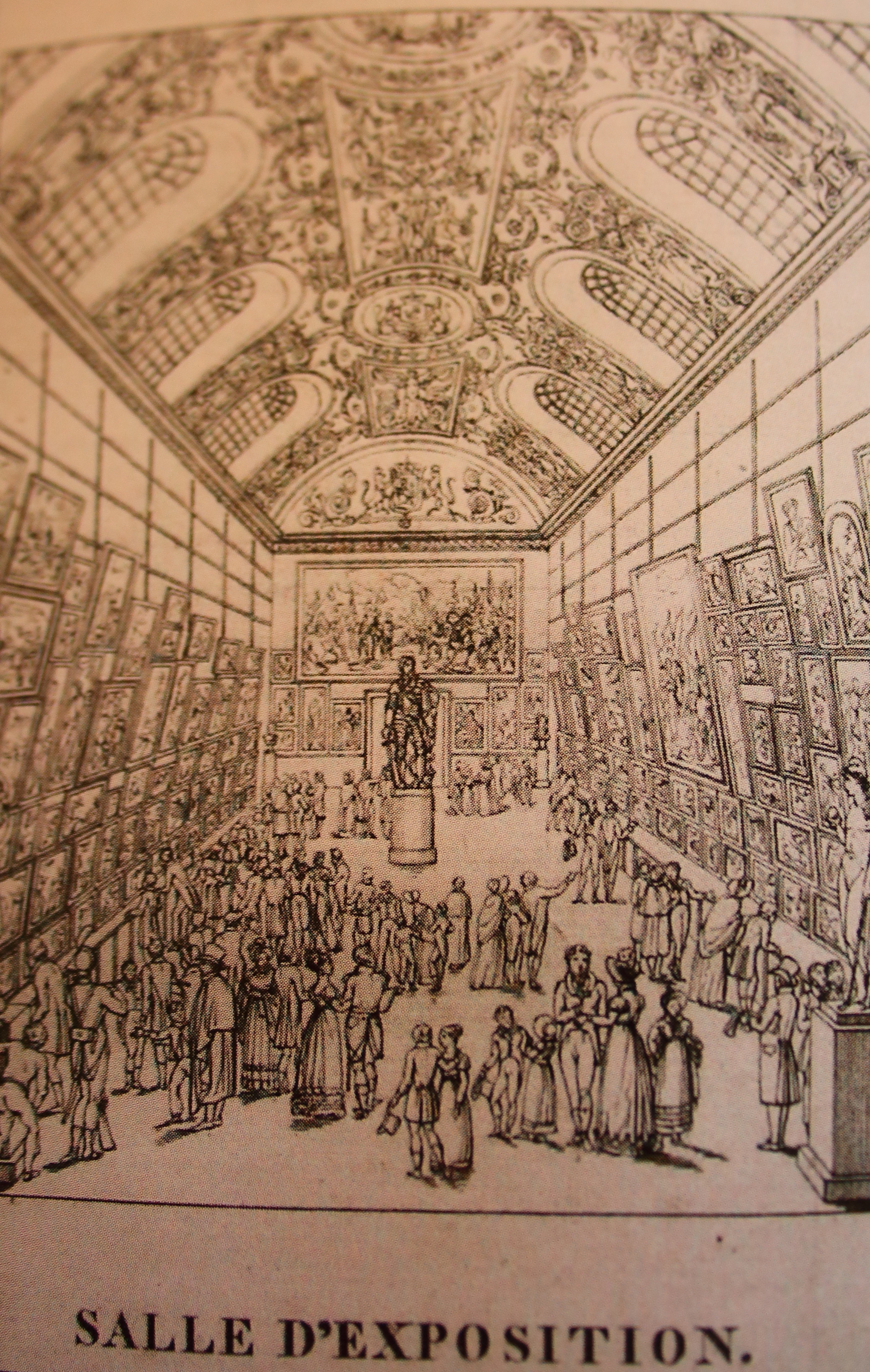
Calloigne's plaster model of the statue at the Ghent 'Salon' in 1820

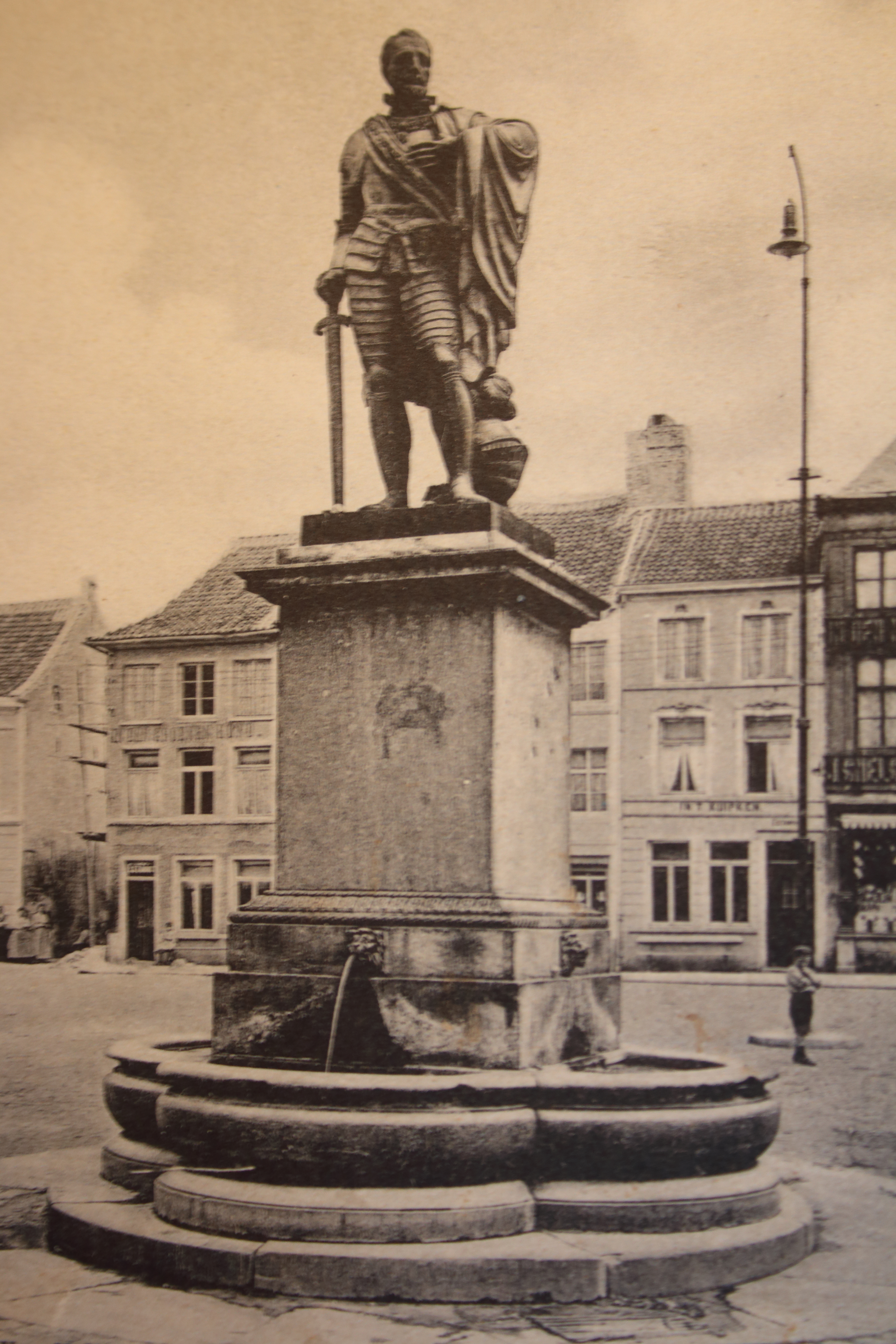
Statue of Egmont, market square, Zottegem (old photo)

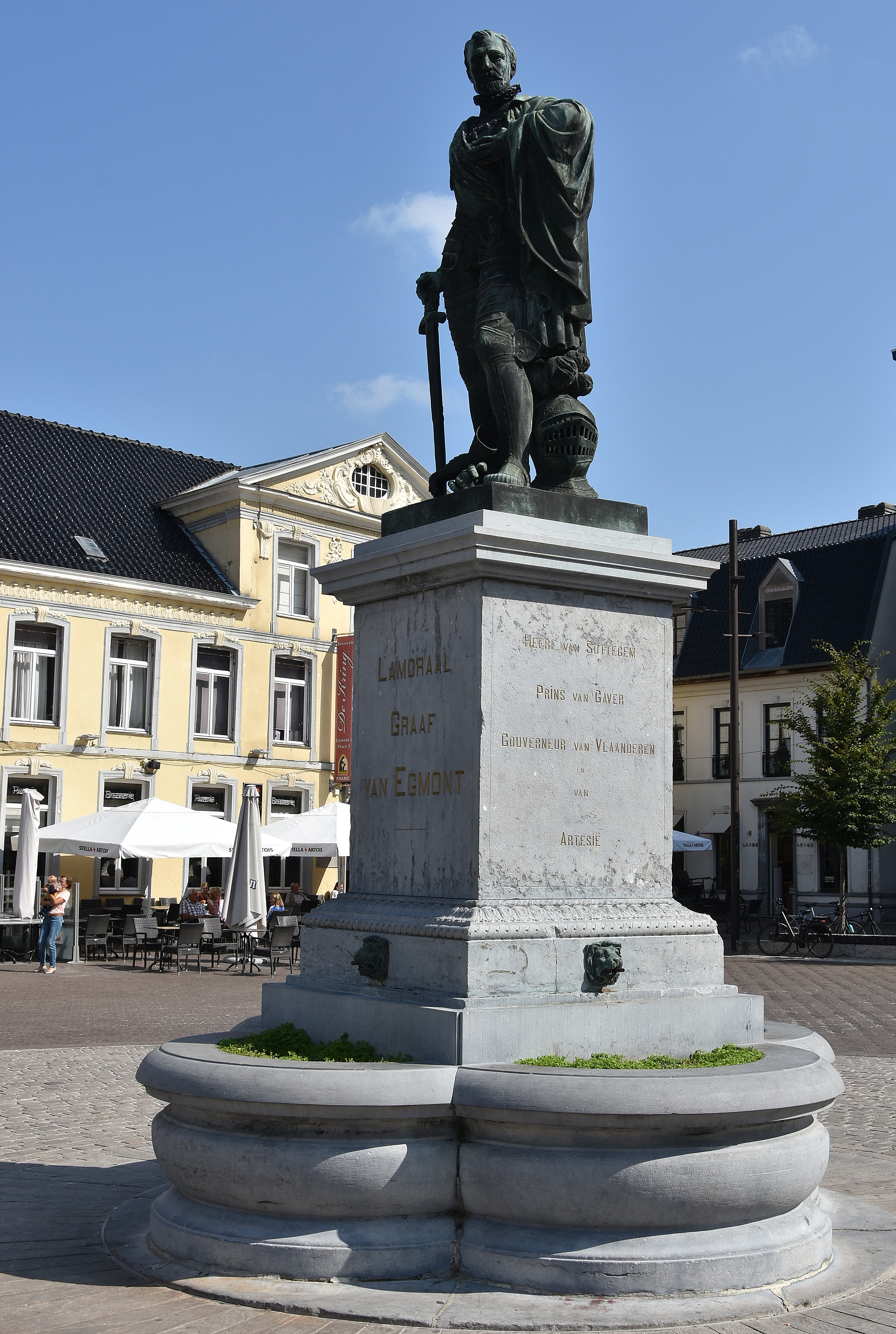
Statue of Egmont, market square, Zottegem (bronze)

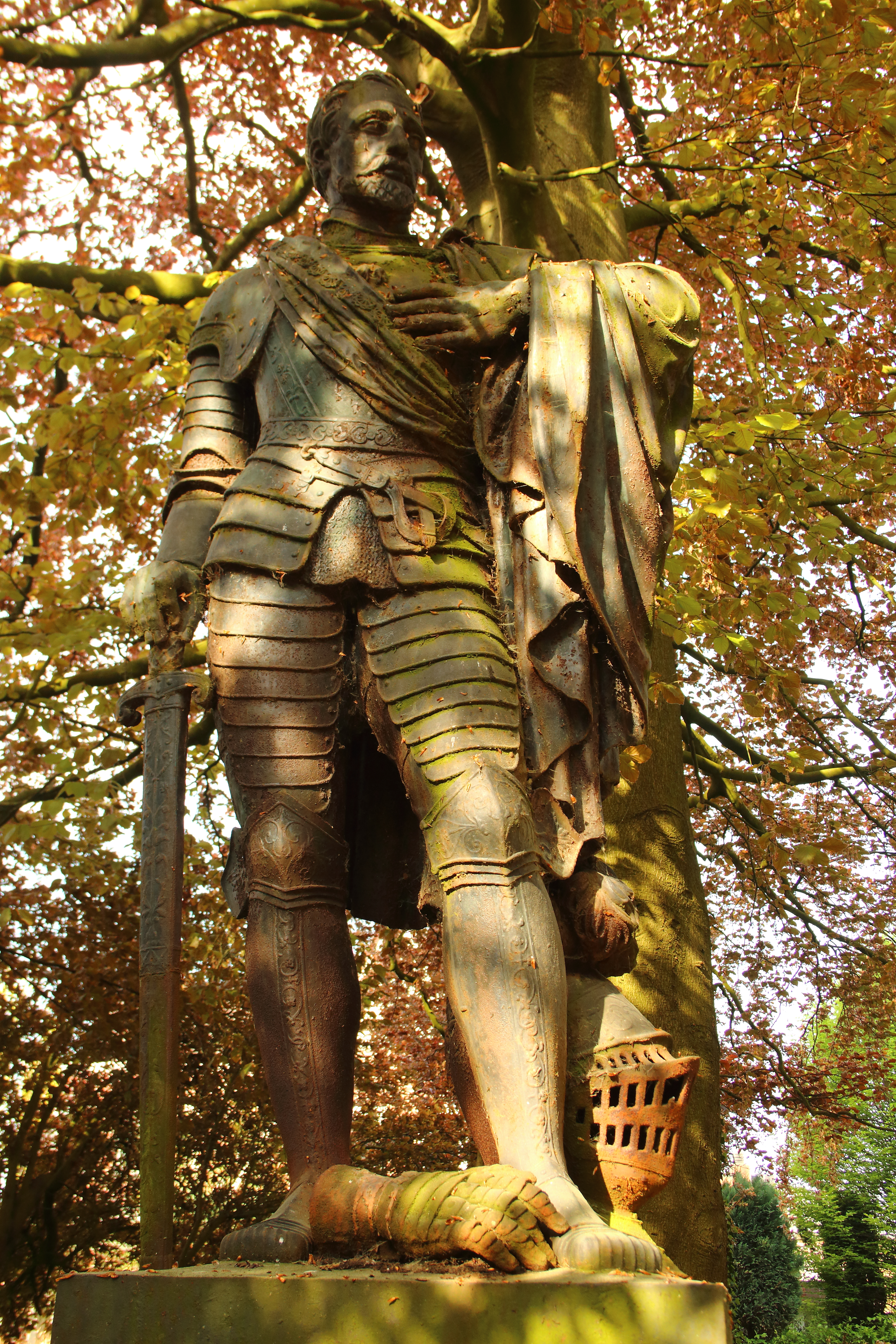
Statue of Egmont, Egmont Castle, Zottegem (wrought iron)

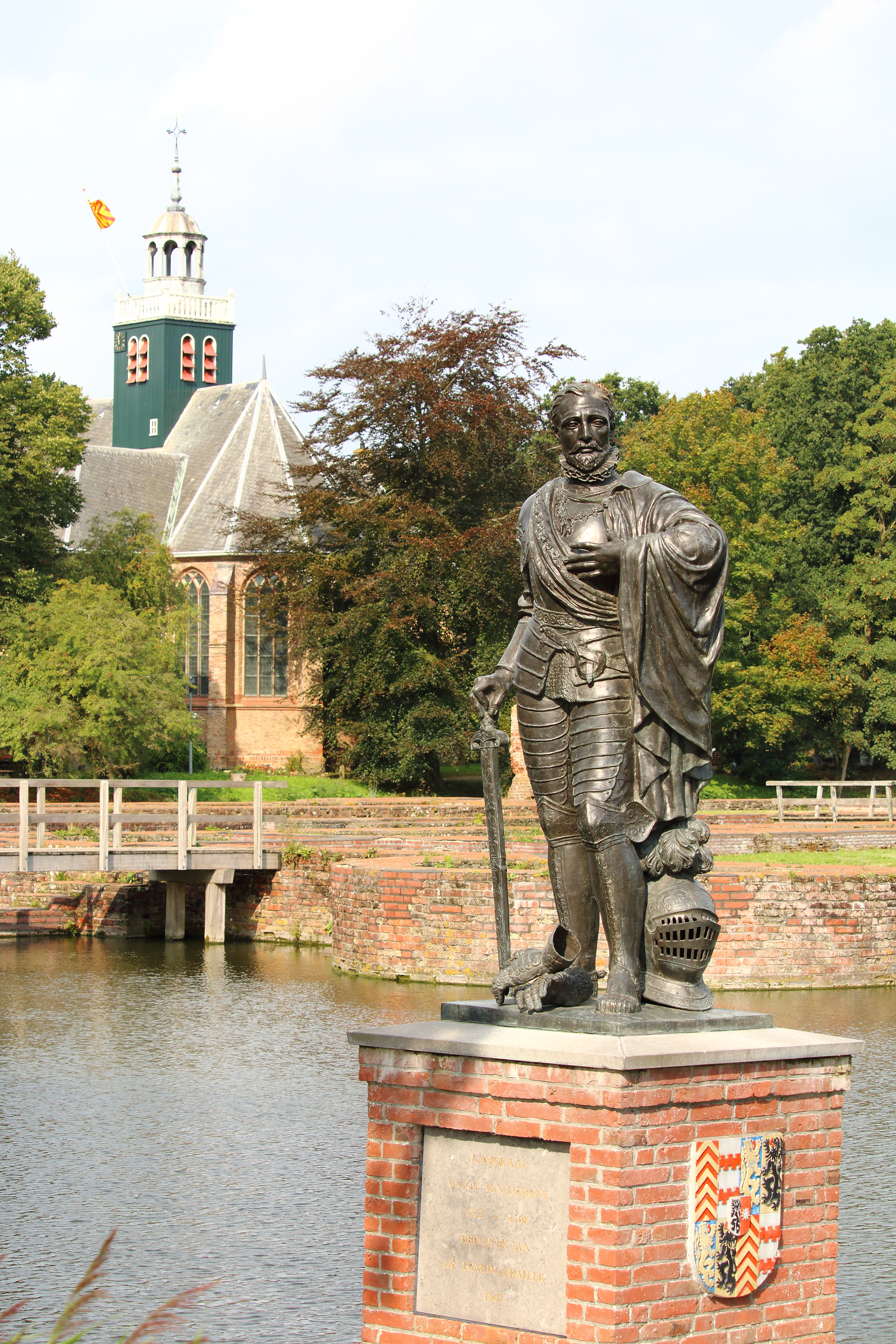
Statue of Egmont, Egmond Castle, Egmond aan den Hoef (bronze)

== Commemoration ==
On 5 June 2018, simultaneous commemoration ceremonies were held at the statues in Zottegem and Egmont aan den Hoef to remember the 450th anniversary of the beheading of Lamoral count of Egmont.
