= Charles Eugène de Lalaing d'Audenarde =

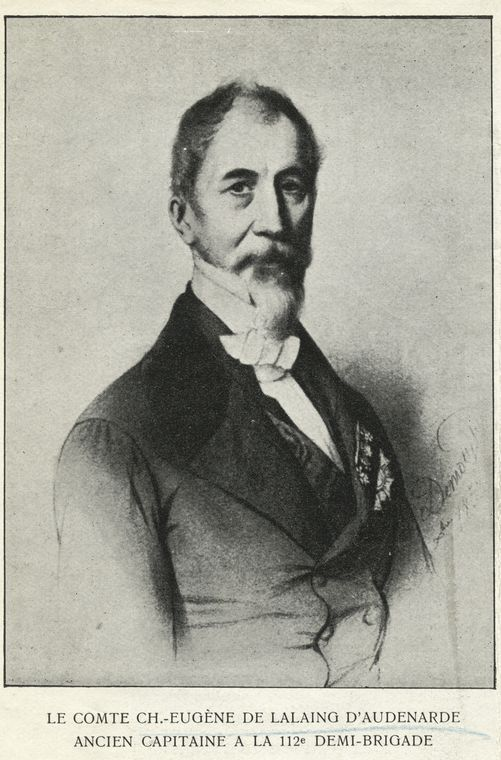
- Charles-Eugène de Lalaing d'Audenarde
- Born: 13 November 1779; Paris
- Died: 4 March 1859 (aged 79); Paris
- Occupation: Military

Charles Eugène de Lalaing d'Audenarde (French pronunciation: [ʃaʁl øʒɛn də lalɛ̃ dodnaʁd]; 13 November 1779 – 4 March 1859) was an officer in the French army during the French Revolutionary Wars and the Napoleonic Wars.

He was born in the House of Lalaing, descendant of Philip de Lalaing, Lord of La Mouillerie. His father was Eugène-François de Lalaing d'Audenaerde, Lord Chamberlain of the Empress and his mother was Agathe-Sophie d'Epegrac.

His name is inscribed on the Eastern pillar (column 12) of the Arc de Triomphe.
