= Lamoral, Count of Egmont =

General and statesman in Flanders (1522–1568)

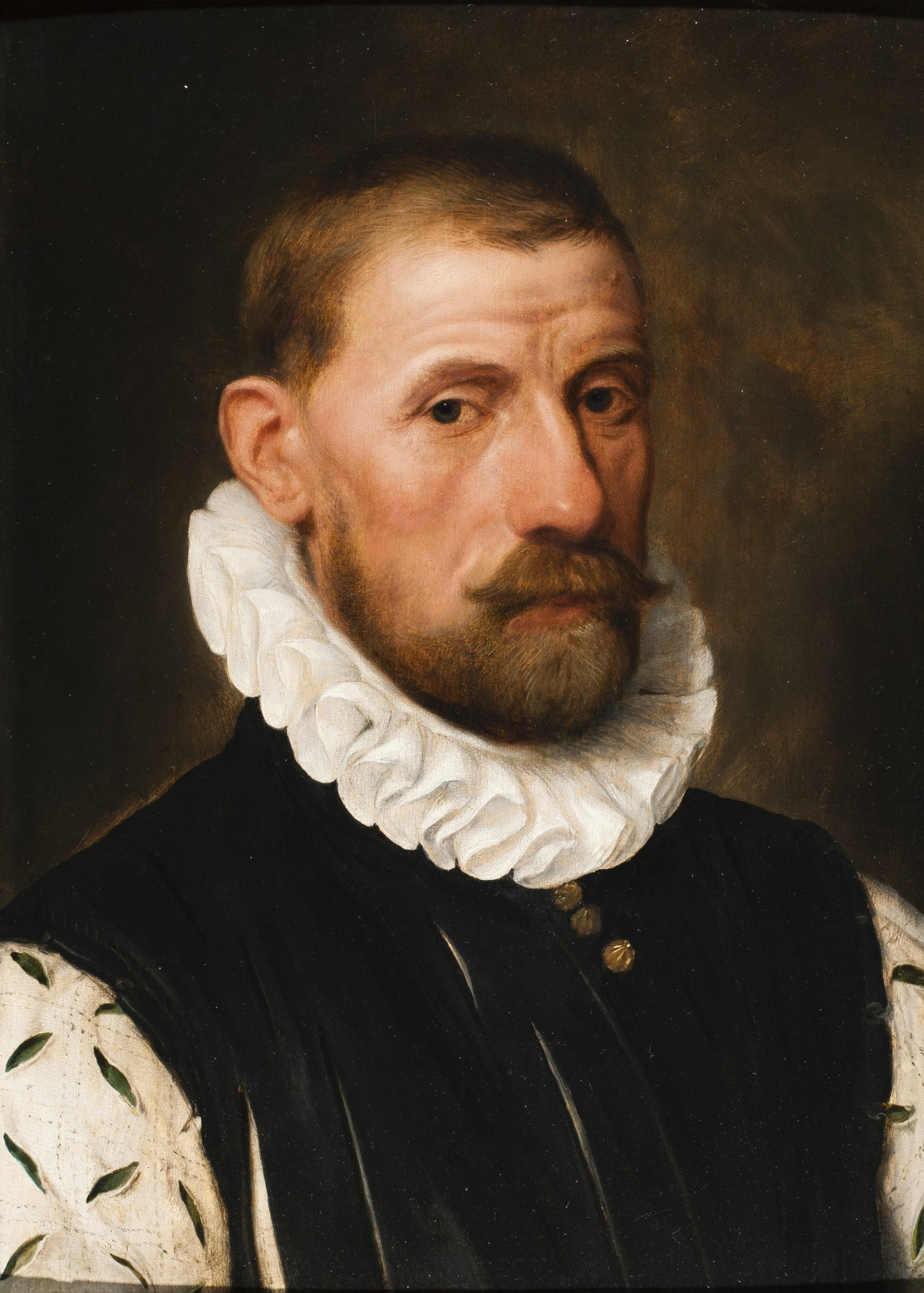
- Portrait of Lamoral, Count of Egmont by Frans Pourbus the Elder.
- Born: 18 November 1522
- Died: 5 June 1568 (aged 45)

Lamoral, Count of Egmont, Prince of Gavere (18 November 1522 – 5 June 1568) was a general and statesman in the Spanish Netherlands just before the start of the Eighty Years' War, whose execution helped spark the national uprising that eventually led to the independence of the Netherlands.

== Biography ==
The Count of Egmont was at the head of one of the wealthiest and most powerful families in the Low Countries. Paternally, a branch of the Egmonts ruled the sovereign duchy of Guelders until 1538. Lamoral was born in Château de Lahamaide near Ellezelles. His father was John IV of Egmont, knight in the Order of the Golden Fleece. His mother belonged to a cadet branch of the House of Luxembourg, and through her he inherited the title prince de Gavere. During his youth, he received a military education in Spain. In 1542, he inherited the estates of his elder brother Charles in Holland. His family's stature increased further in 1544 when, at Spires, in the presence of the Holy Roman Emperor Charles V and of the Archduke Ferdinand I, he married the Countess Sabina of Palatinate-Simmern, whose brother became the Elector Palatine Frederick III. By appointment, he was Captain General of the Lowlands under Charles V, knight of the Golden Fleece from 1546, and Imperial Chamberlain. In the service of the Spanish army, he defeated the French in the battles of Saint-Quentin (1557) and Gravelines (1558). Egmont was appointed stadtholder of Flanders and Artois in 1559, aged only 37.

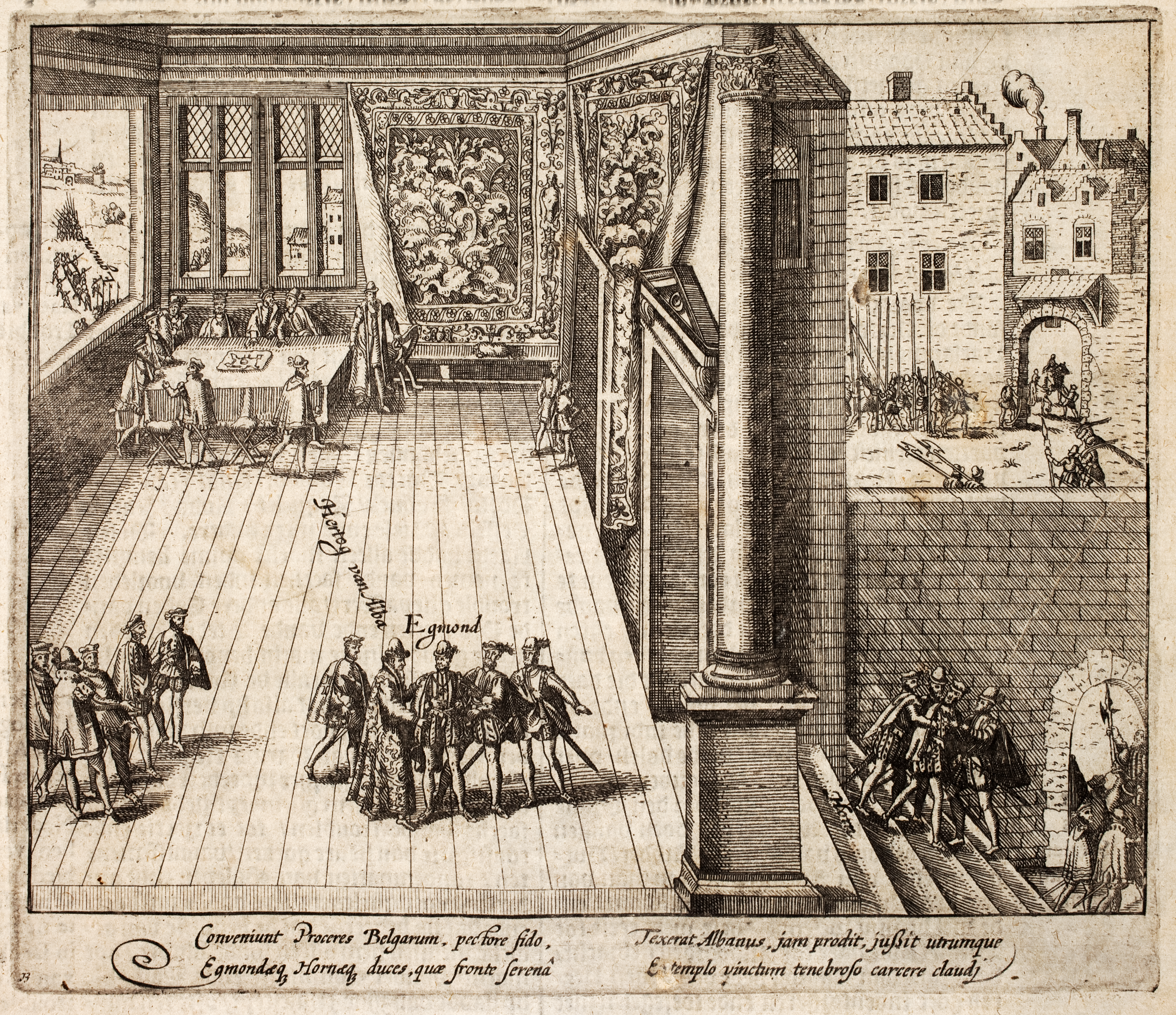
The duke of Alba arrests Egmont and Hoorne after an invitation for a meal, September 1567 (from Pieter Christiaanszoon Bor: Oorsprongh, begin en vervolgh der Nederlandsche oorlogen, 1621

As a leading Netherlandic nobleman, Egmont was a member of King Philip II of Spain's official Council of State for Flanders and Artois. Together with William, Prince of Orange and the Count of Horn, he protested against the introduction of the inquisition in Flanders by the cardinal Antoine Perrenot Granvelle, bishop of Arras. Egmont even threatened to resign, but after Granvelle left, there was a reconciliation with the king. In 1565, running short of funds as he had continued the representation of the Low Countries entirely from his own pocket, Egmont went to Madrid to beseech Philip II, the king of Spain, for a change of policy in the Netherlands, but met with little more than courtesy.

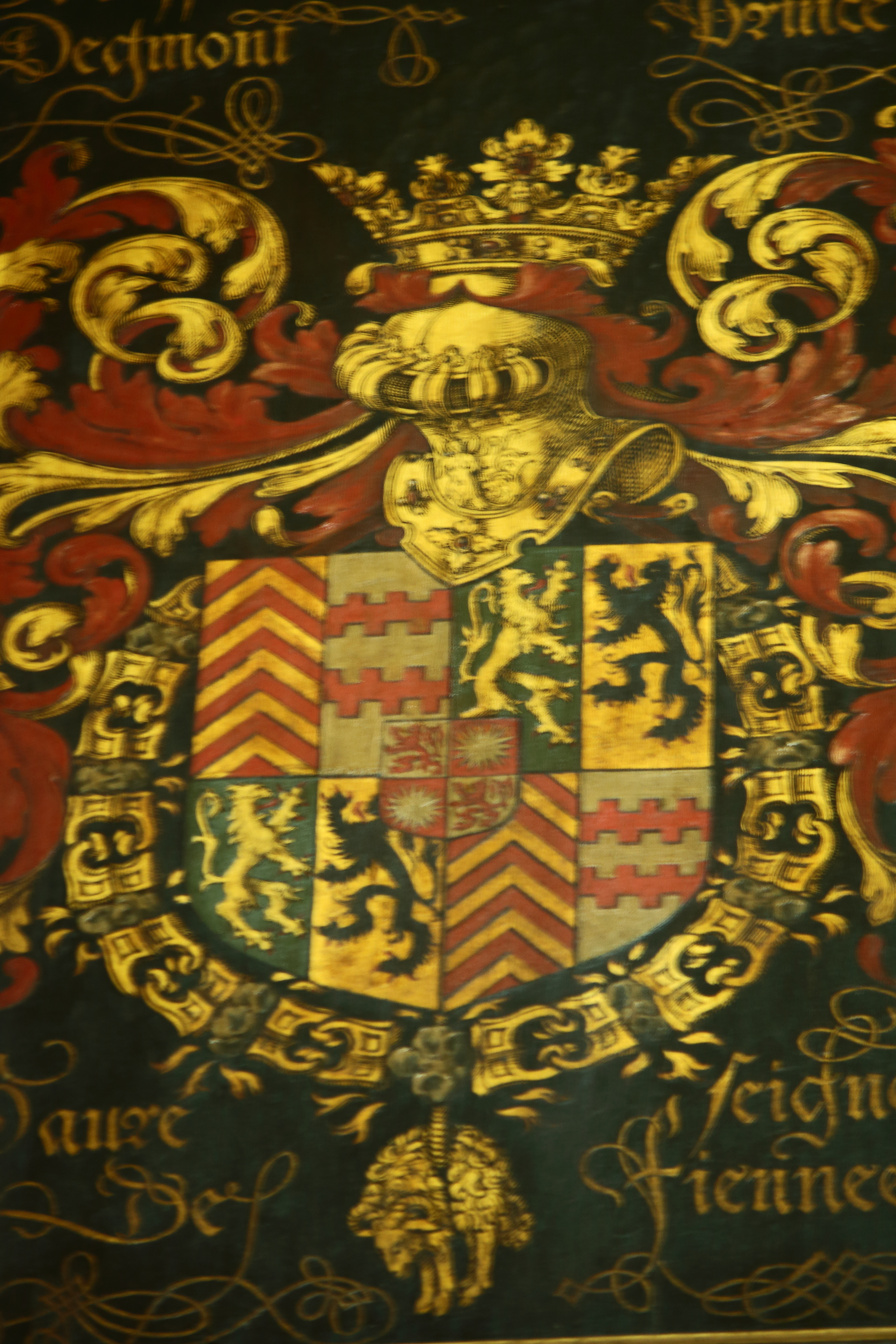
Coat of Arms of Lamoraal van Egmont

Soon thereafter, the 'Beeldenstorm' started, the massive iconoclasm of Catholic churches in the Netherlands, and resistance against the Spanish rule in the Netherlands increased. As a devout Catholic, Egmont deplored the iconoclasm, and remained faithful to the Spanish king. Nevertheless, he and Horn opposed the Inquisition, which angered Philip.

After Philip II sent the Duke of Alba to the Netherlands, William of Orange decided to flee Brussels. Having always declined to do anything that smacked of lèse majesté, Egmont refused to heed Orange's warning, and he and Horn decided to stay in the city. Upon his arrival, Alba almost immediately had the counts of Egmont and Horn arrested on charges of heresy and imprisoned them in a castle in Ghent, prompting Egmont's wife and their eleven surviving children (from the thirteen they had together) to seek refuge in a convent. Pleas for amnesty came to the Spanish king from throughout Europe, including from many reigning sovereigns, the Order of the Golden Fleece (both being knights of the Order, and thereby theoretically immune from trial by any but their peers of the Order), and the king's kinsman the Emperor Maximilian II, all to no avail.

=== Execution and destruction of Castle Egmond ===
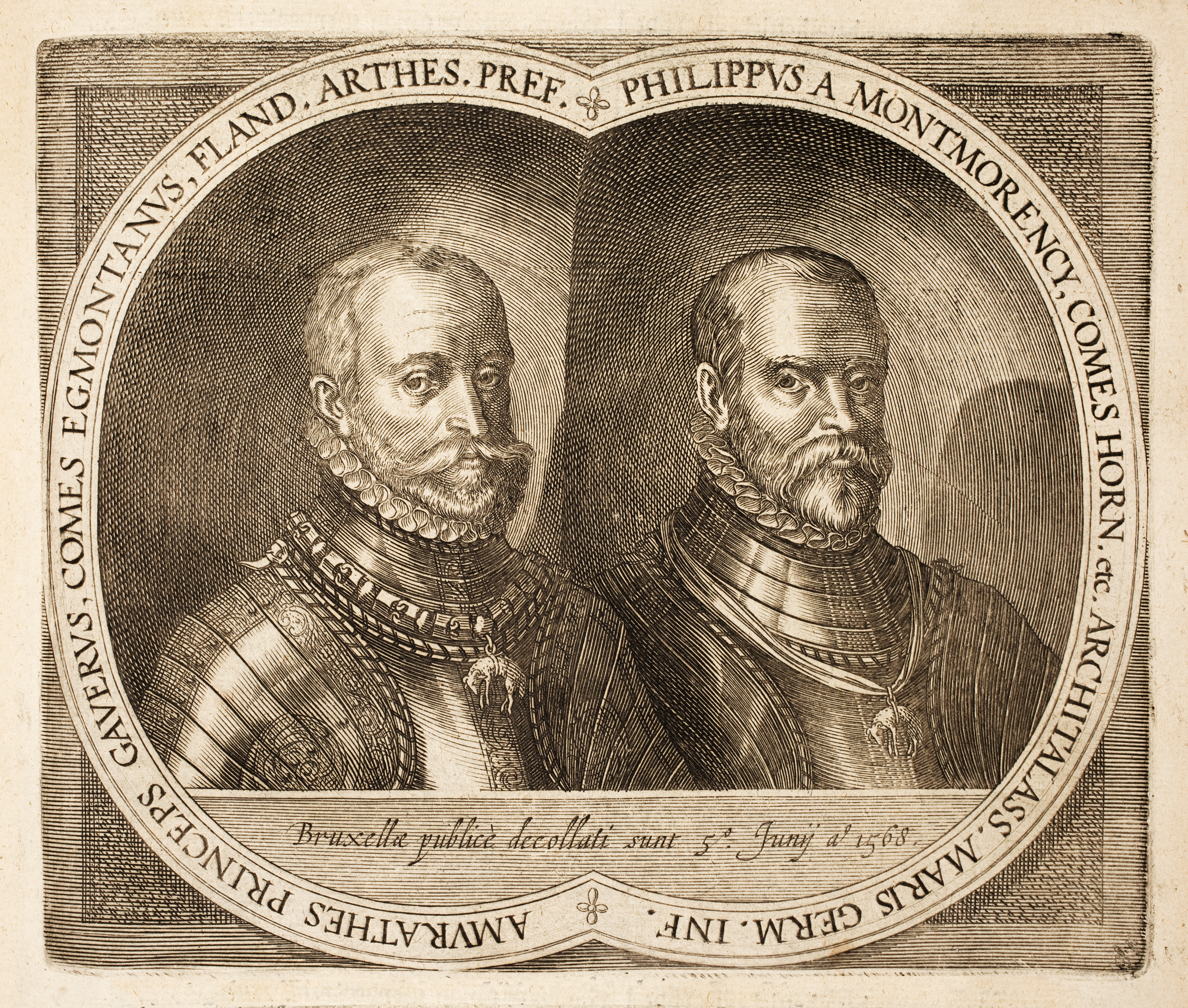
Egmont and Hoorne, from Pieter Christiaanszoon Bor: Oorsprongh, begin en vervolgh der Nederlandsche oorlogen, 1621

On 4 June, Egmont and Horn were condemned to death, and lodged that night in the King's House in Brussels. On 5 June 1568, both men were beheaded before the Town Hall on the Grand-Place/Grote Markt (Brussels's main square), Egmont's uncomplaining dignity on the occasion being widely noted. Their deaths led to public protests throughout the Netherlands, and contributed to the resistance against the Spaniards.

The Count of Egmont lies buried in Egmont's crypt at the Church of the Assumption of Our Lady in Zottegem, a Belgian city in which Egmont is remembered by his two statues, his museum and his castle. Egmond Castle in Egmond aan den Hoef was destroyed in 1573 and in 1997 a statue in his memory is erected on the site of the ruins.

A statue erected on the Square du Petit Sablon/Kleine Zavelsquare in Brussels commemorates the Counts of Egmont and Horn, in historical overview usually mentioned together as "Egmond en Hoorne" and hailed as the first leaders of the Dutch revolt, as the predecessors of William of Orange, who grew to importance and obtained the leadership after their execution, and who was assassinated in 1584 in Delft, having succeeded in liberating parts of The Netherlands in the early years of the Eighty Years' War (1568–1648).

Egmont's offices and vast estates were forfeited upon his execution, escheating to the Prince-Bishop of Liège. By inheritance he had been count of Egmont (or Egmond), prince de Gavre and van Steenhuysen, baron de Fiennes, Gaesbeke and La Hamaide, seigneur de Purmerent, Hoogwoude, Aertswoude, Beyerland, Sottenghien, Dondes, Auxy and Baer. Some of these lands were eventually returned to his heirs by the Bishop, principally in 1600. Despite the taint of treason and the family's impoverishment, his niece Louise of Lorraine-Mercœur, was chosen to become the Queen consort of Henry III of France in 1575.

== Marriage and children ==
From his marriage with Sabina of Palatinate-Simmern (1528–1578), he had 3 sons and 9 daughters.
His children were :

- Leonore(1545) married Georg van Horn
- Francoise (1549)
- Magdalena (1552) married to Floris van Stavele, count of Herlies
- Marie-Chretienne also known as Marie -Christine (1555) married firstly to Edouard de Bournonville, secondly to Guillaume van Lalaing, count of Hoogstraten (son of Antoine de Lalaing) married thirdly Karl von Mansfeld
- Philip (1558–1590), 5th Count of Egmont, Order of the Golden Fleece, married to Maria van Horne, no issue.
- Anna (1560) became a nun at St Waltrude in Mons
- Maria, also became a nun.
- Lamoral (1565–1617), 6th Count of Egmont, married to Marie de Pierrevive, no issue
- Charles (1567–1620), 7th Count of Egmont, married to Marie de Lens, Lady of Aubigny. Had issue.
- Isabella
- Sabina
- Segerse Cornelis

== Literary treatments ==
The Count of Egmont is the main character in a play by Goethe, Egmont. In 1810, Ludwig van Beethoven composed the Egmont Overture an overture and incidental music for a revival of the play.

== Images ==
Coat of Arms of Lamoral of Egmont, with chain of the Order of the Golden Fleece

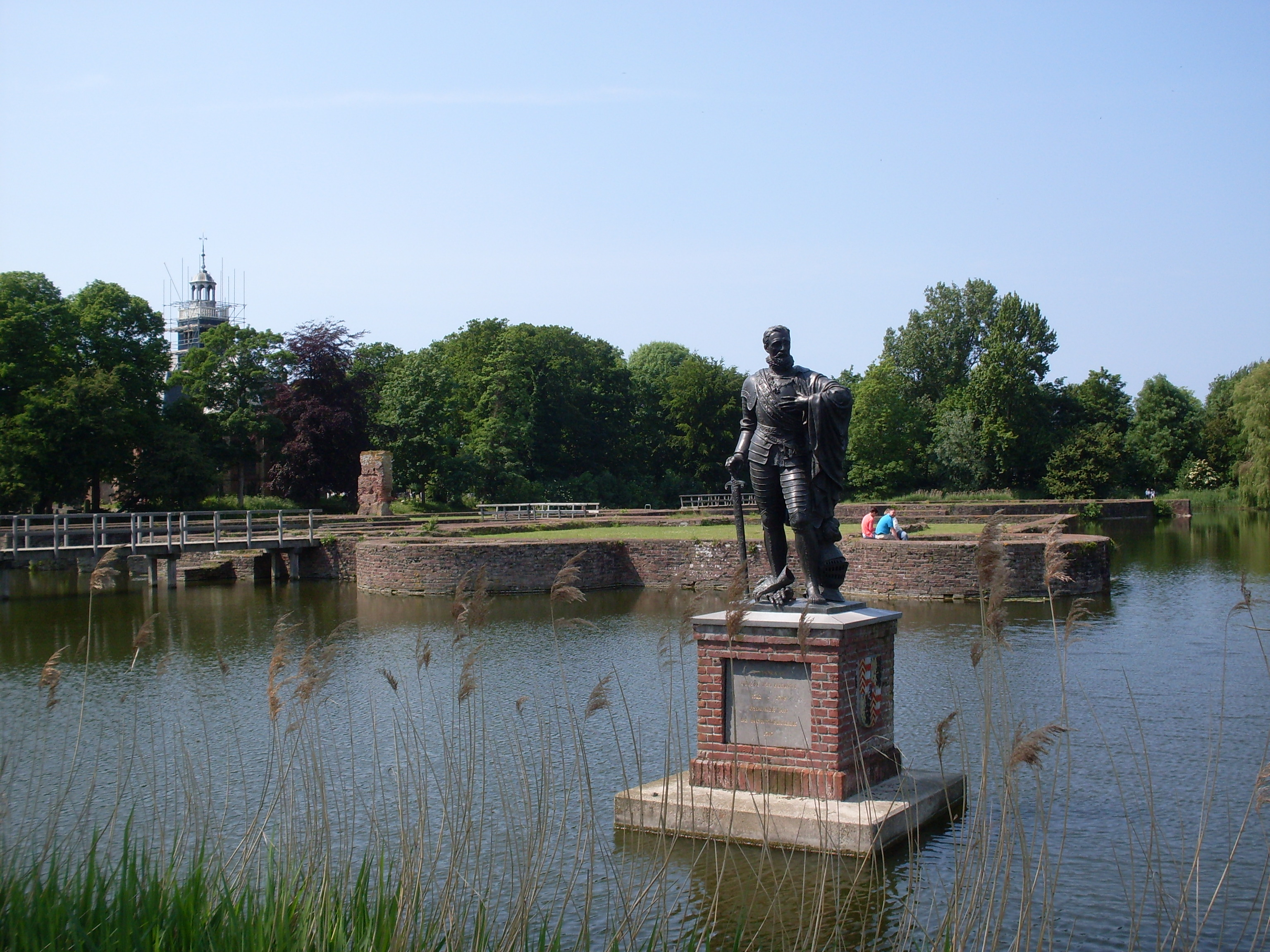
A statue of Egmont stands in the middle of the old moat of Egmond aan den Hoef

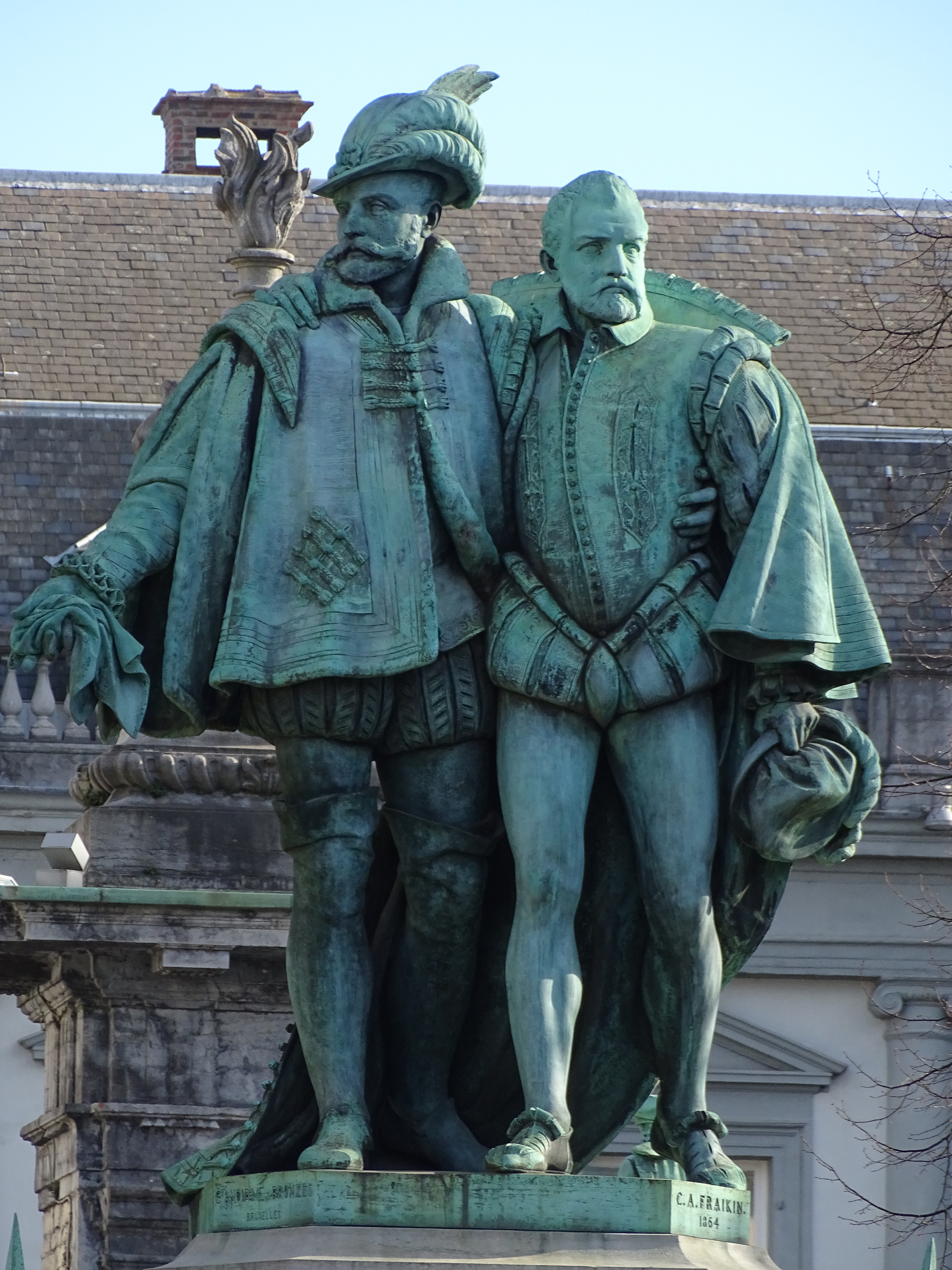
Statue of Egmont and Hoorne, Square du Petit Sablon/Kleine Zavelsquare, Brussels

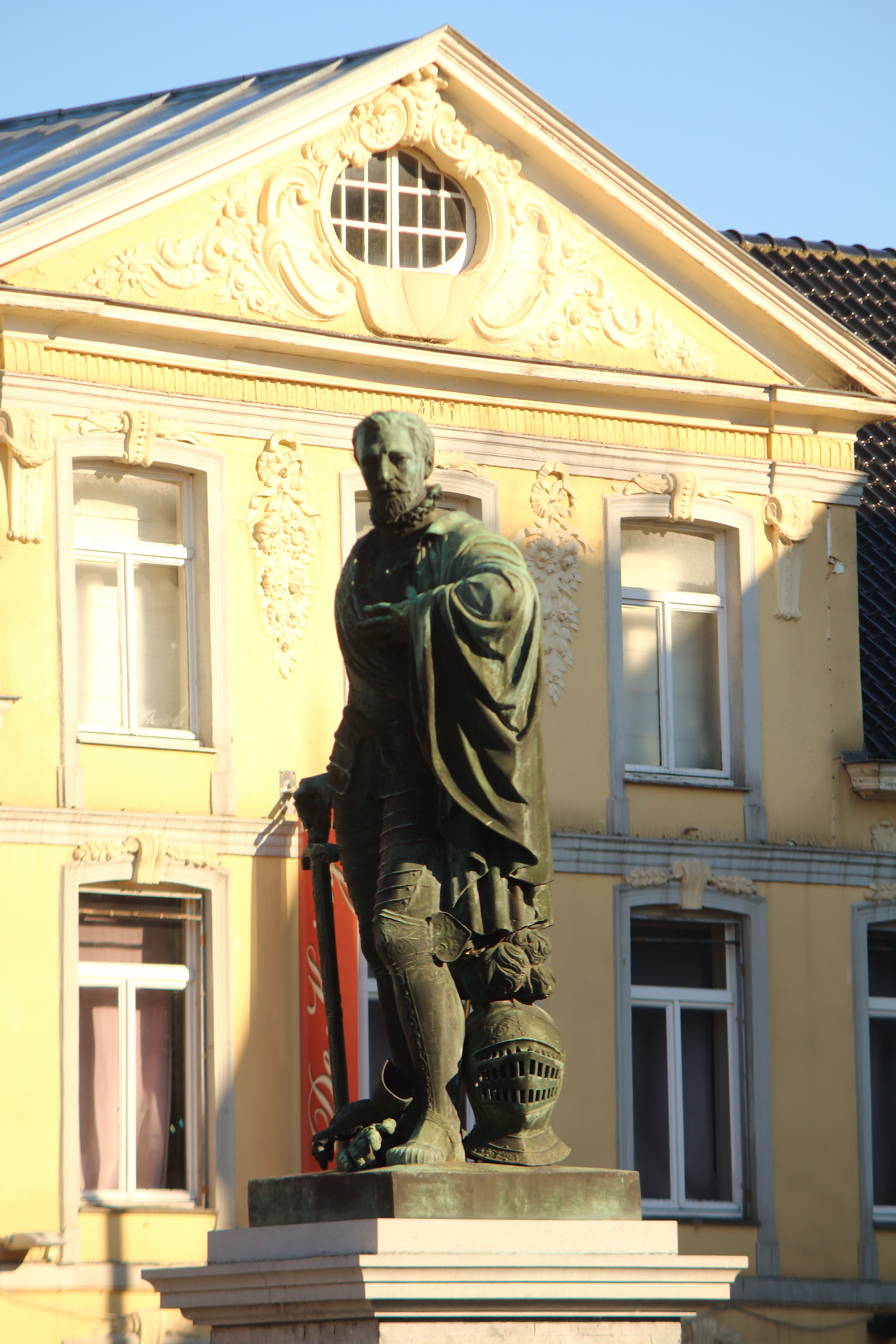
Statue of Egmont on the market square in Zottegem

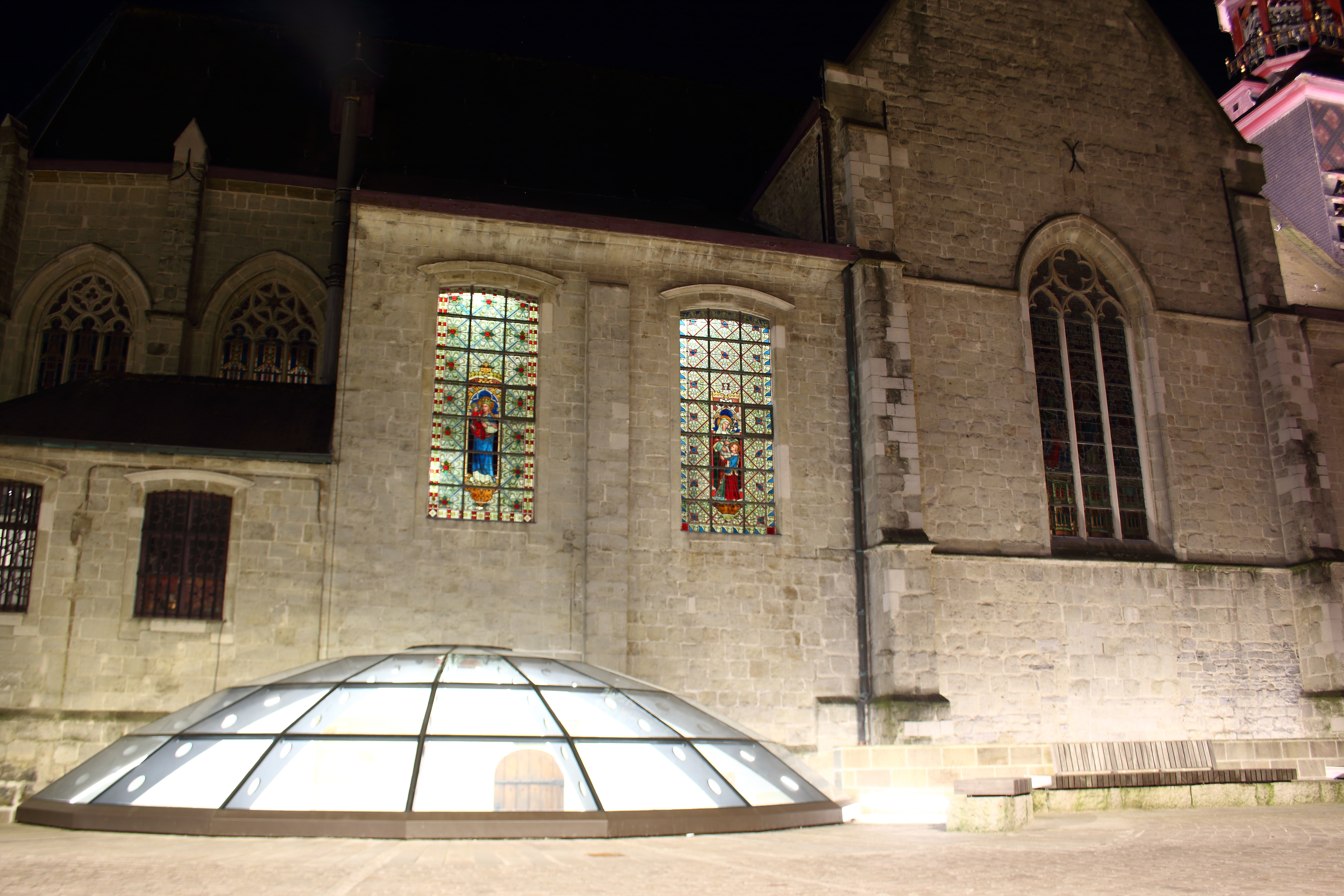
Egmont's crypt on the market square in Zottegem

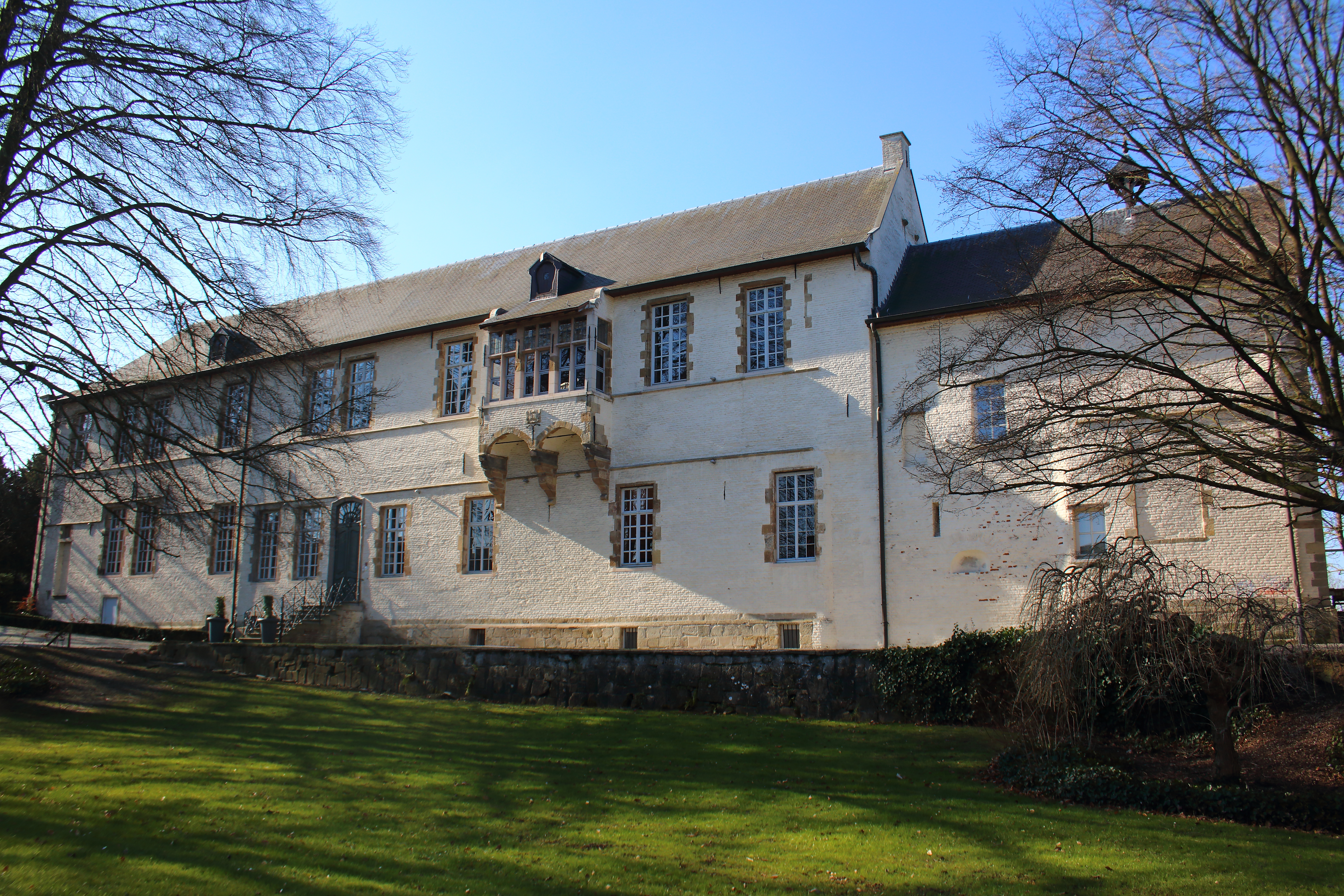
Egmont Castle in Egmont Park in Zottegem

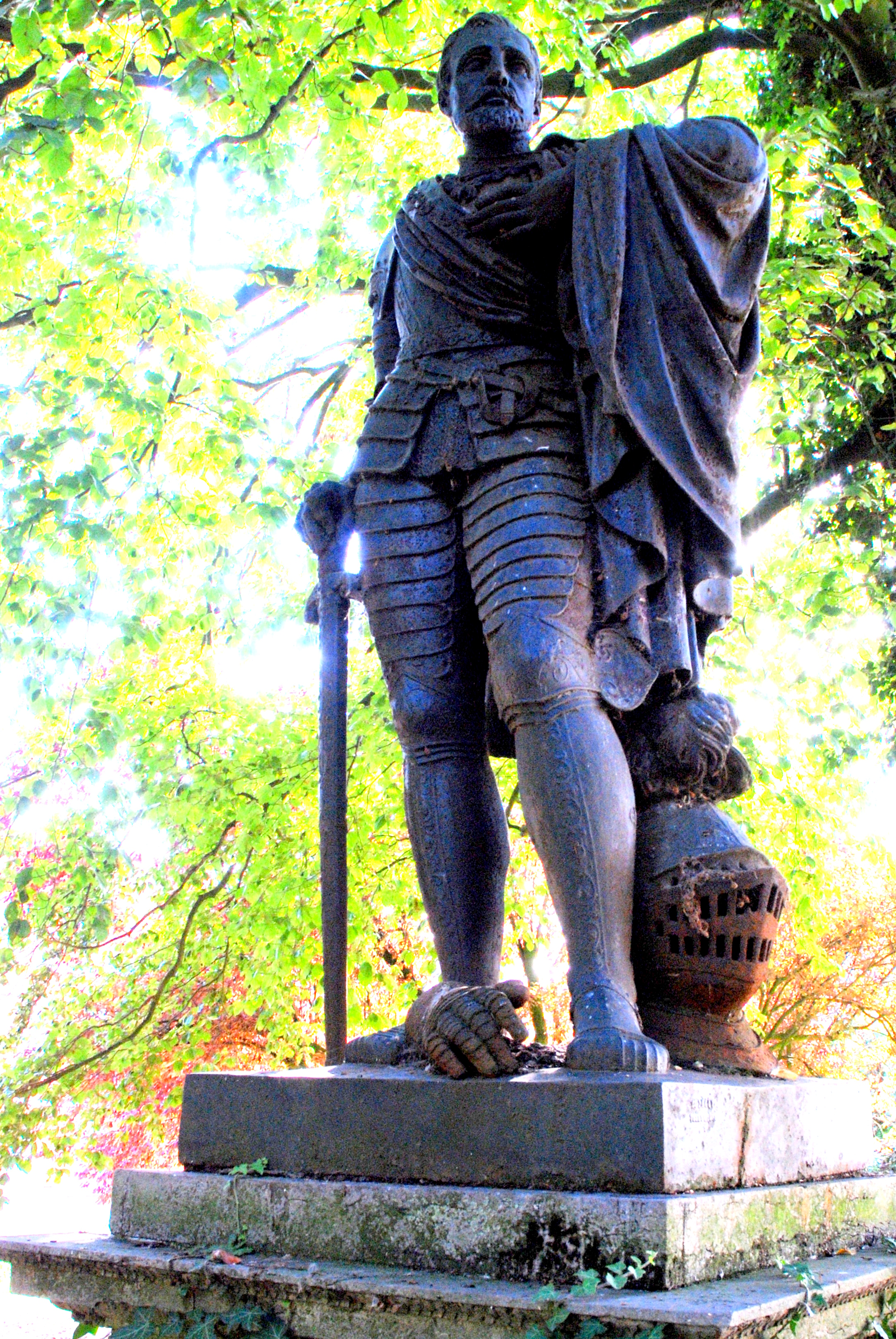
Egmont's statue in Egmont Park in Zottegem

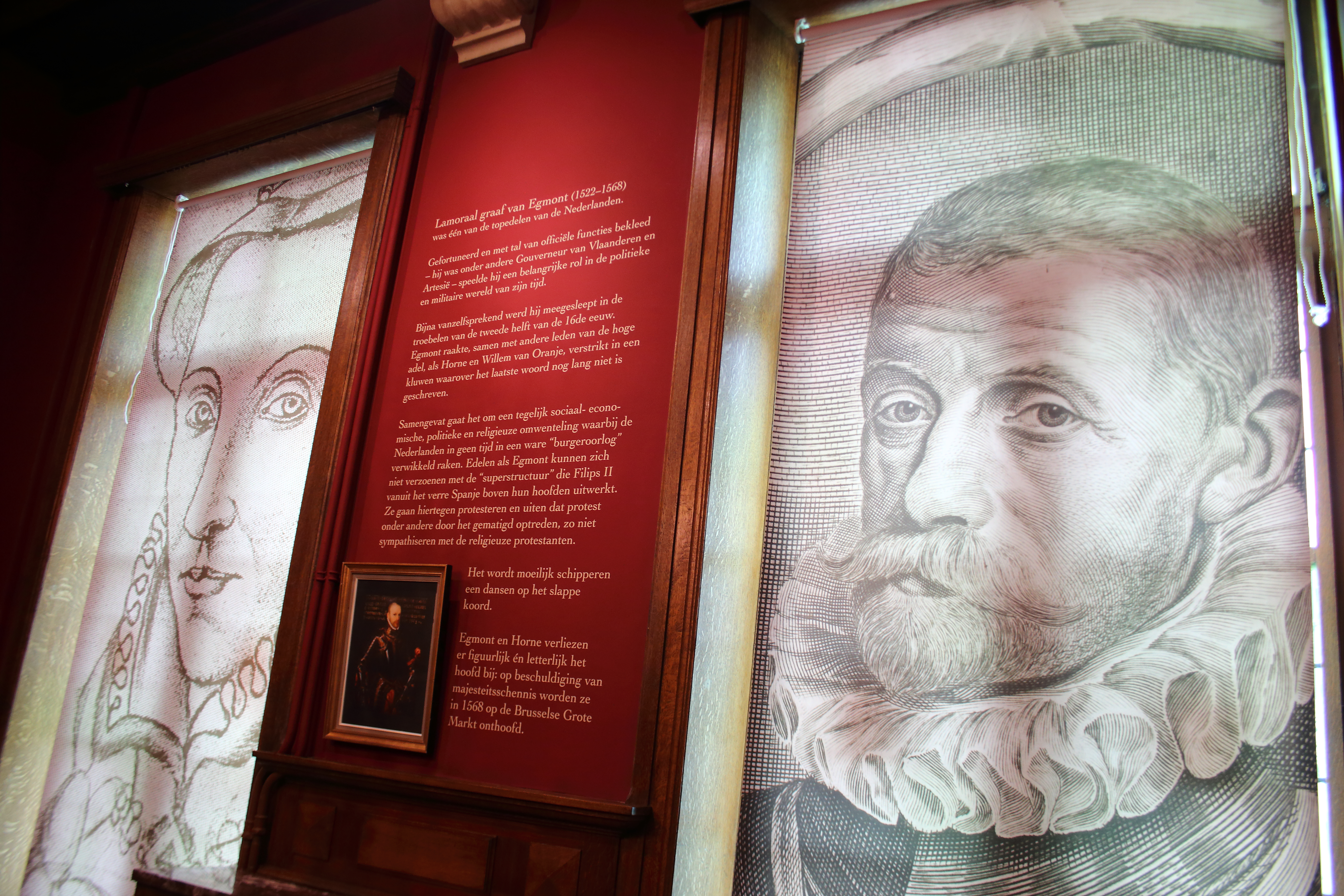
Egmont Museum in Zottegem

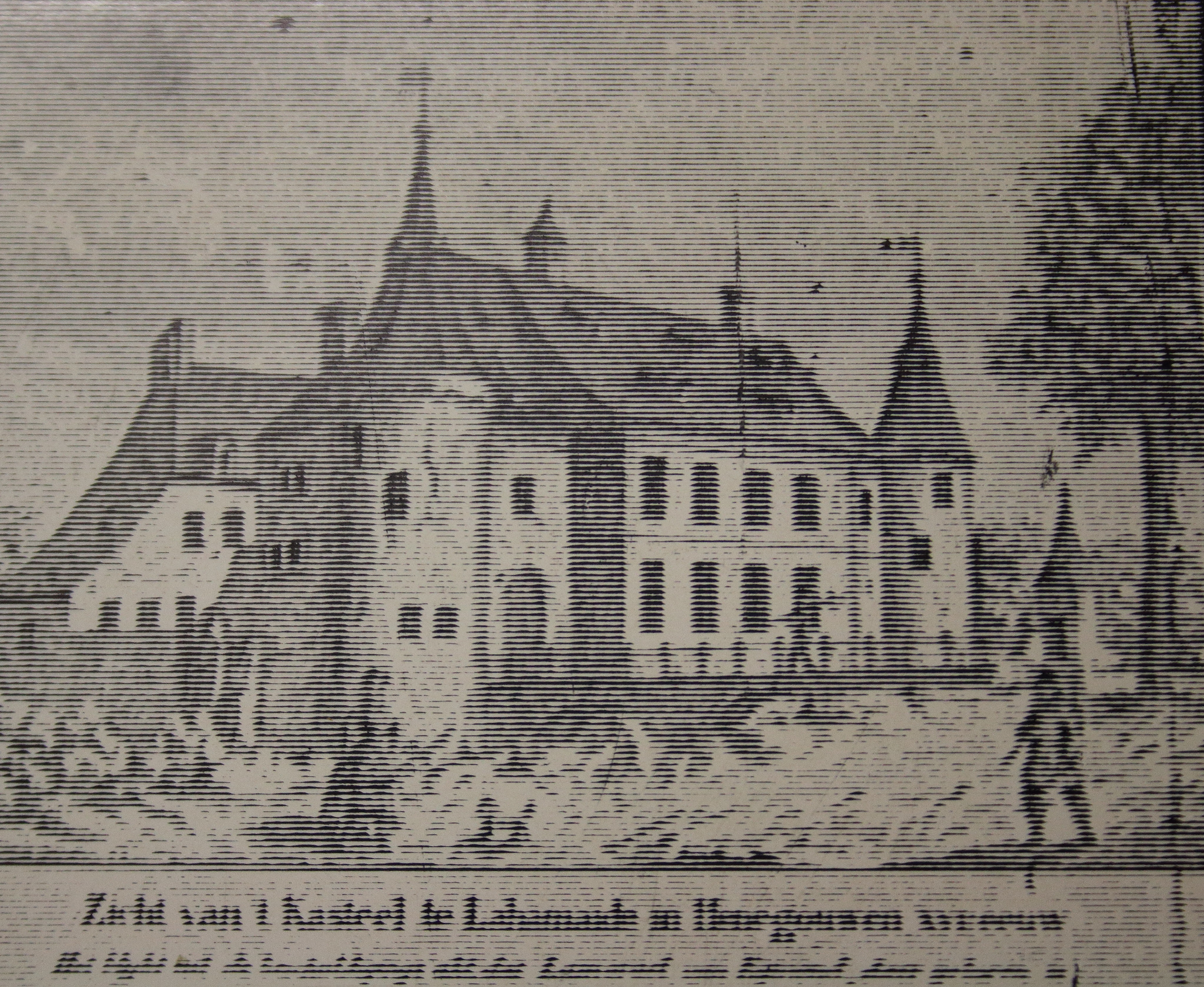
The castle of La Hamaide, where Egmont was born

== Notes and references ==
Lamoral, Count of Egmont House of Egmond Born: 8 November 1522 Died: 5 June 1568
Regnal titles
Preceded by Charles I, Count of Egmont	Count of Egmont; 1541–1568	Succeeded by Philip, Count of Egmont
Preceded by Charles I, Count of Egmont	Lord of Purmerend, Purmerland and llpendam 1541–1568	Succeeded by Philip, Count of Egmont
Preceded by Françoise of Luxembourg	Prince of Gavere; 1541–1568	Succeeded by Philip, Count of Egmont
