= Viscount of Audenaerde =

Flemish feudal title

Viscount of Audenaerde was a Flemish feudal title. It was associated successively with two families.

== History ==
The title was created by Maximilian of Austria around 1482, after the death of his wife Mary of Burgundy. He created the title as a mark of merit, with the privilege of hereditary rights. The title was given to Gaultier (Wouter) van Rechem, chatelain of the castle of Burgundy. The noble house of Rechem was from Kortrijk and possessed the dominium of Kerchove.

== Viscounts of Audenaerde ==
	Name	Notes
House of Rechem
1st Viscount	Gaultier I of Rechem	Created by Archduke Maximilian.
2nd Viscount	Gaultier II of Rechem	Married to Maruerite de Lummene
3rd Viscount	Jan de Rechem	Married to Barbe Stommelin
4th Viscount	Florence de Rechem	Lady of Audenaerde, married to Philip de Lalaing, Lord of La Mouillerie
House of Lalaing
5th Viscount	Jacques I de Lalaing	Grandson of the 3rd Viscount
6th Viscount	Philippe de Lalaing	No heirs
7th Viscount	Charles I de Lalaing	Married to Catherine de Fourneau
8th Viscount	Ferry de Lalaing	Married to Marie-Anne van der Noot
9th Viscount	Jacques II de Lalaing	Married to Maria Therese Rym
10th Viscount	Maximilien I Joseph de Lalaing	Married to Marie-Catherine de Larchier, Countess of Thildoncq
11th Viscount	Charles II Joseph de Lalaing	Married to Marie Camille de Beer
12th Viscount	Maximilien II Charles de Lalaing	Anne-Marie de Draeck
