= Philip de Lalaing, Lord of La Mouillerie =

Philip de Lalaing (1499–1550), also known as "the bastard of Lalaing", was an illegitimate son of Antoine I de Lalaing and Ysabeau d'Haubourdin. He was legitimised in March 1524, and served Margaret of Austria as master of the household, knight of honour, and adviser. In 1529 Margaret sent him to France as an ambassador extraordinary on behalf of Charles V, Holy Roman Emperor.

== Personal life ==
He married Florence de Rechem, Viscountess of Audenaerde. He was succeeded by their eldest son Jacques I de Lalaing, 5th Viscount of Audenaerde. Their daughter became a lady-in-waiting in the household of Philip de Lalaing, 2nd Count of Hoogstraten. One of his descendants is Charles Eugène de Lalaing d'Audenarde.

He died 2 April 1550, aged fifty.
