= Margaret of Parma =

Governor of the Habsburg Netherlands in 1559–67 and 1578–82

Margaret
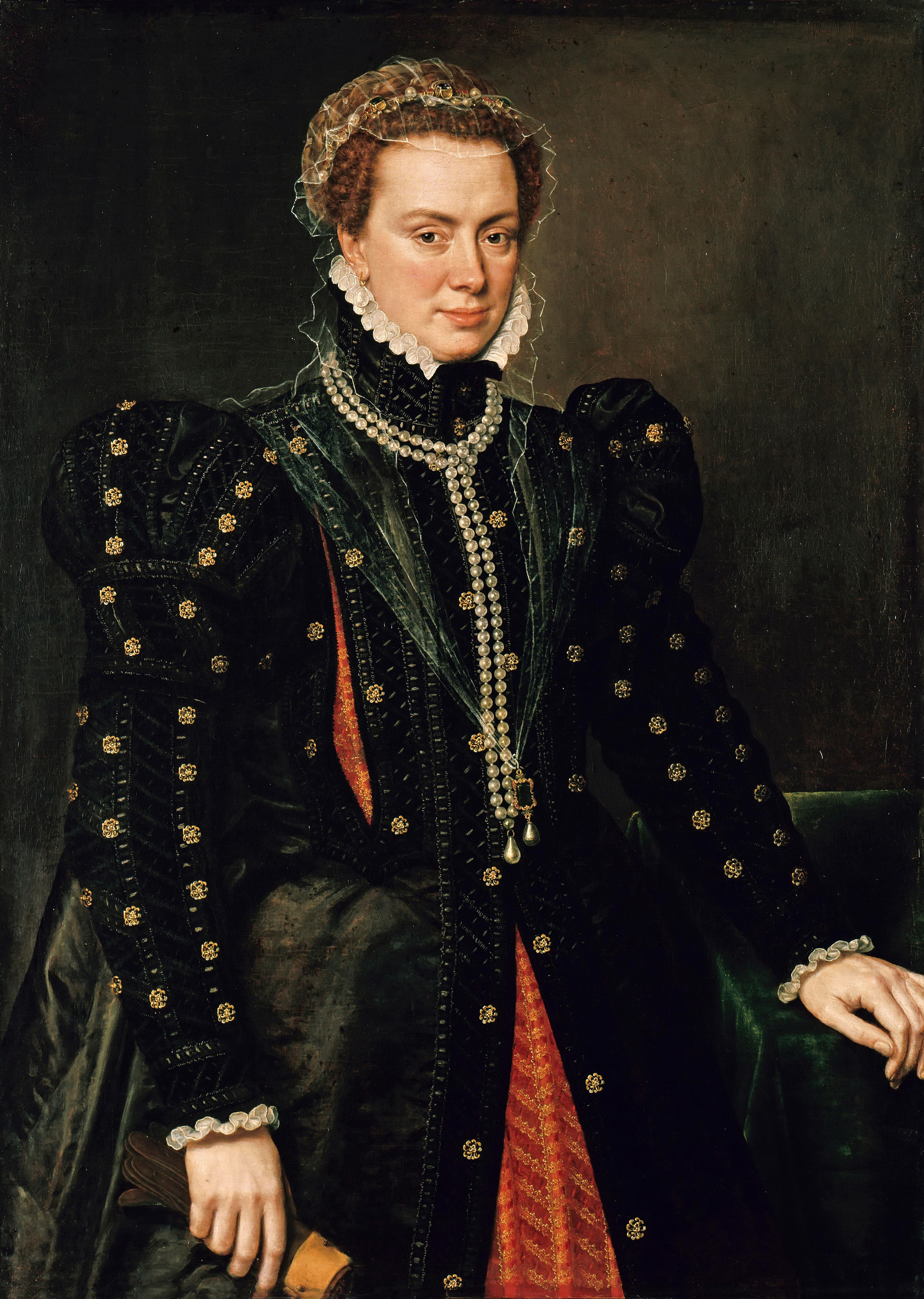
- Portrait by Antonio Moro, c. 1562

Duchess consort of Florence
- Tenure: 18 January 1536 – 6 January 1537

Duchess consort of Parma and Piacenza
- Tenure: 10 September 1547 – 18 January 1586
- Born: 5 July 1522; Oudenaarde, County of Flanders, Holy Roman Empire
- Died: 18 January 1586 (aged 63); Ortona, Kingdom of Naples
- Burial: San Sisto, Piacenza
- Spouses: Alessandro de' Medici, Duke of Florence (m. 1536; died 1537) Ottavio Farnese, Duke of Parma (m. 1538)
- Issue: Charles Farnese; Alexander Farnese, Duke of Parma
- House: Habsburg
- Father: Charles V, Holy Roman Emperor
- Mother: Johanna Maria van der Gheynst

Margaret (Italian: Margherita di Parma; 5 July 1522 – 18 January 1586) was Duchess of Parma from 1547 to 1586 as the wife of Duke Ottavio Farnese and Governor of the Habsburg Netherlands from 1559 to 1567 and from 1578 to 1582. She was the illegitimate daughter of Charles V, Holy Roman Emperor, and Johanna Maria van der Gheynst. She had briefly been Duchess of Florence from 1536 to 1537 by her first marriage to Alessandro de' Medici, Duke of Florence.

== Biography ==
Margaret's mother, Johanna Maria van der Gheynst, a servant of Count Charles de Lalaing, Seigneur de Montigny, was a Fleming. Margaret was brought up in Mechelen, under the supervision of two powerful Spanish and Austrian Habsburg Imperial family relatives, her great-aunt, the Archduchess Margaret of Austria, and her aunt Mary of Austria, who were successive governors of the Habsburg Netherlands from 1507 to 1530 and from 1530 to 1555, respectively.

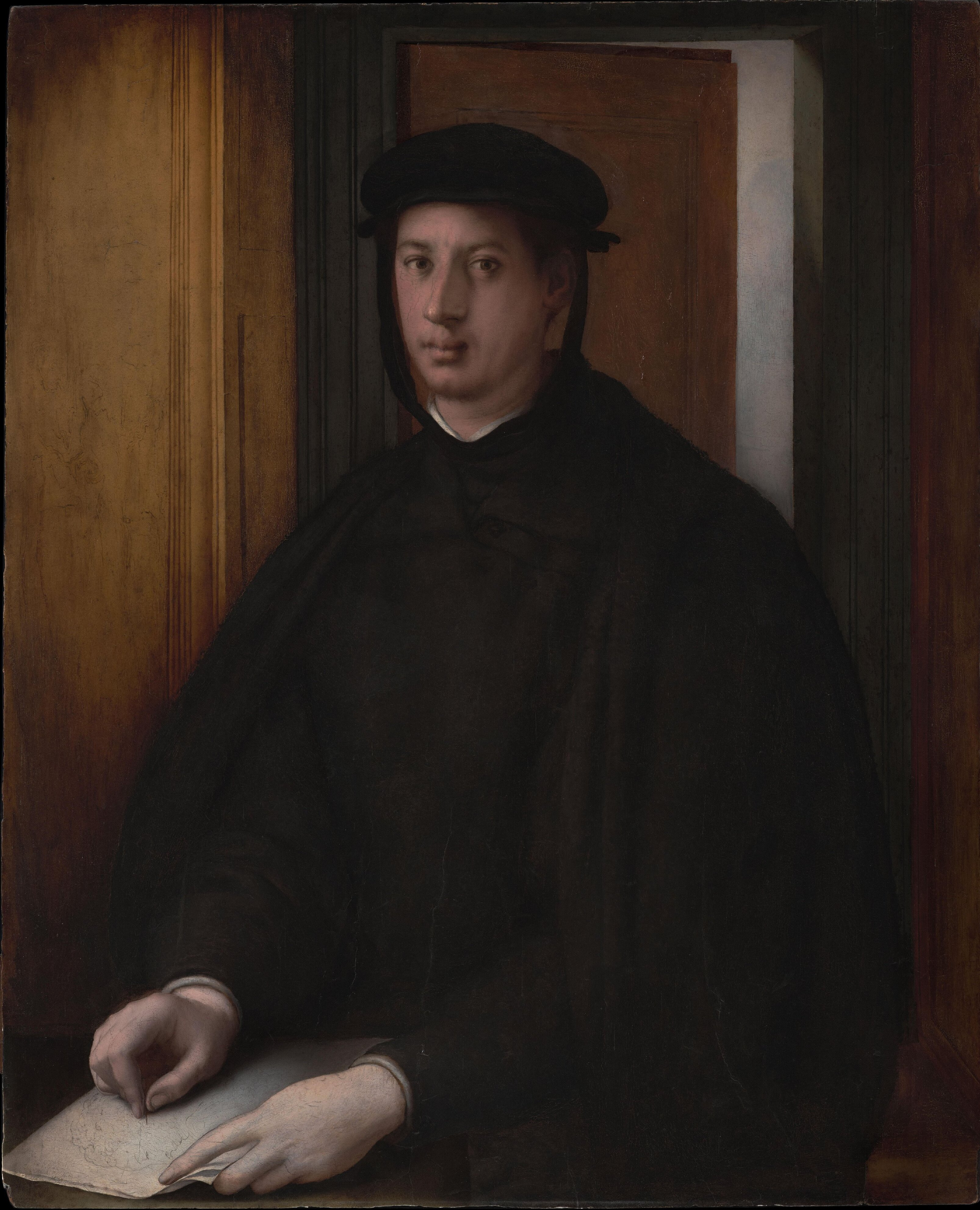
Alessandro de' Medici, Duke of Florence

Her early life followed a strict routine set forth by her father, Charles V, who used his daughter as part of his plans to secure his empire.

In 1527, the year she turned five, she became engaged to the nephew of Pope Clement VII, Alessandro de' Medici, Duke of Florence, to assist her father's ambition in gaining influence in Italy. The marriage negotiations had been initiated in 1526, and in 1529, the agreement was officially signed by her father and the Pope. In 1529, Margaret was acknowledged by her father and allowed to assume the name Margaret of Austria, and in 1533, the 11-year-old girl was brought to live in Italy and educated in the courts of Florence, Rome, and Parma. There, she was taught skills that helped her grow as an independent woman. As Margaret did not spend much time with her husband, she used this time to become exposed to the surrounding Italian culture. Though she was multi-lingual, she preferred the Italian language for the rest of her life.

On 13 June 1536 in Florence, she married Alessandro, who was assassinated on 6 January 1537. On 4 November 1538 in Rome, the 15-year-old widow married Ottavio Farnese, Duke of Parma, the 14-year-old grandson of Pope Paul III. At first she refused to marry him. Although the union proved an unhappy one, it gave her years of experience in Rome, and produced twin sons, one of whom died in infancy. She would continue her studies of the arts and politics while being married to Ottavio. The couple lived separately for much of their lives, and Margaret maintained her own court and chapel. She was in a somewhat difficult position, as the Pope and the Emperor argued about authority over Parma. In 1555, the Farnese family were acknowledged as rulers of Parma by Spain in exchange for the custody of her son.

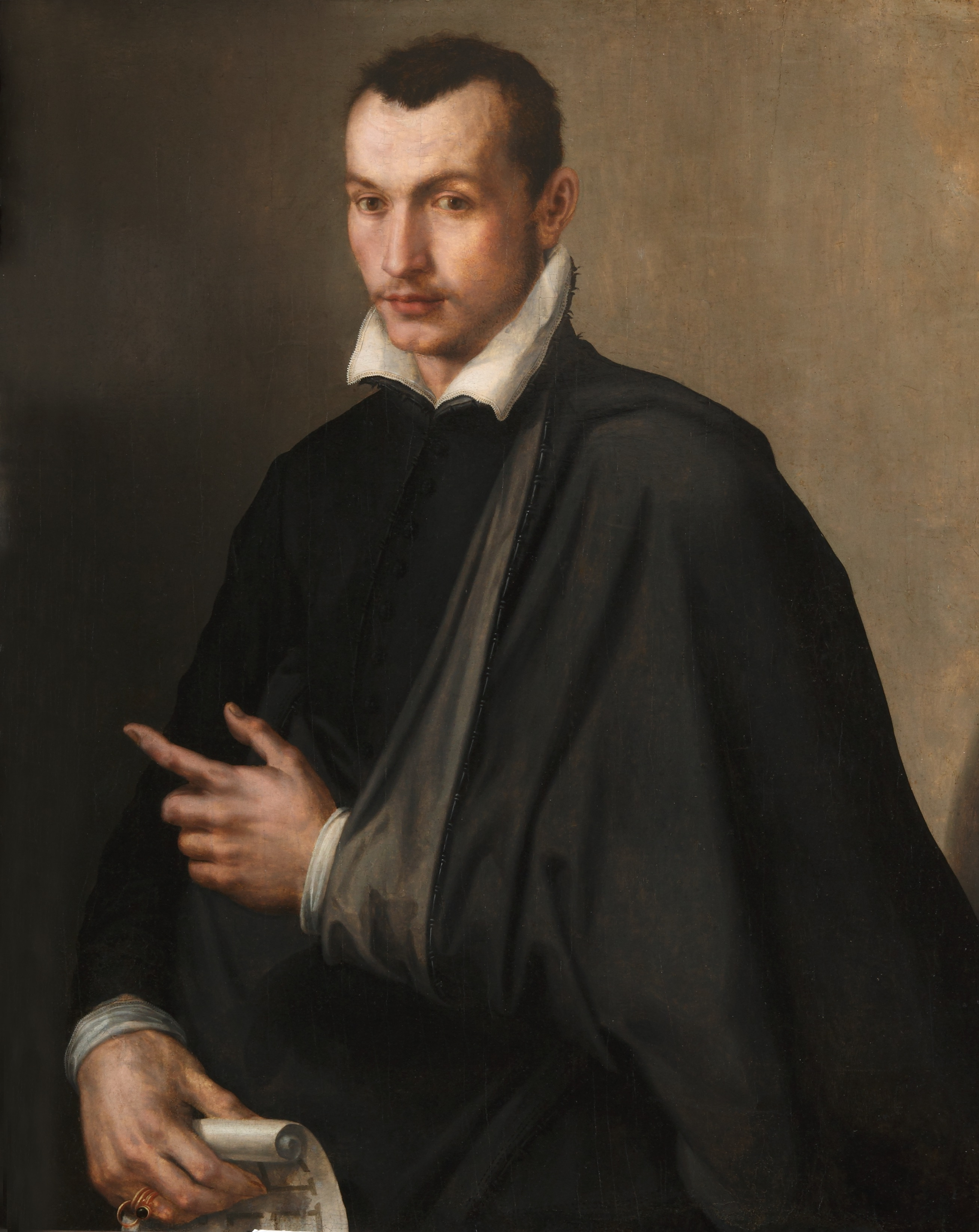
Ottavio Farnese, Duke of Parma c. 1550

In 1555, she left Italy for the Habsburg Netherlands, where she left her son in the care of her half-brother Philip II. Philip appointed her Governor of the Habsburg Netherlands when he left in 1559 for Spain. As governor, Margaret faced the rising storm of discontent against the Inquisition and Spanish despotism, and Philip had left her but nominal authority. He was determined to pursue his own arbitrary course, and the result was the revolt of the Netherlands. Margaret was forced to adjust herself to the advice of Cardinal Granvelle, Philip's choice for her chief councilor, who would grow to be greatly disliked in the Habsburg Netherlands. After Granvelle's exile from the Habsburg Netherlands in 1564, Margaret was forced to rely on the grandees in her Council. In 1565, an opposition party was formed from the Dutch nobility. Margaret received its complaints and, having no army to put down the dissenters, promised to stop religious repression. In 1566, Iconoclastic riots took place all over the Habsburg Netherlands but she managed to quell them, with the help of her stadtholders Philip of Noircarmes (who subjugated the cities of Tournai and Valenciennes) in Hainaut and William of Orange in Holland. The next year, Philip sent her military help led by the Duke of Alba. Margaret warned Philip that actions by Alba would lead to catastrophe, but instead of trying to stop Alba, she resigned when she learned that Alba's power of attorney, granted by Philip, superseded her own.

In 1567, Margaret retired to L'Aquila in Italy. She was appointed Governor of Abruzzo and Viceroy of Naples,where she had inherited a domain from her late husband. She acted as the adviser to her son and to her royal bastard half-brother, John of Austria. In 1578, her son Alexander Farnese was appointed to the office of governor-general of the Habsburg Netherlands; Philip appointed her his co-regent, intending that they would balance each other. However, they were unable to work together, and Margaret retired to Namur in 1582. She was given permission by Philip to return to Italy in 1583. She died in Ortona in 1586 and was buried in the church of S. Sisto in Piacenza.

Charlie R. Steen describes her as "a woman dedicated to compromise and conciliation in public affairs."

She personally asked to Pope Paul III to authorize the veneration of the Seven archangels while Antonio del Duca did the same under the protection of the Colonna family.

== Issue ==
Margaret and her second husband Ottavio had:

- Charles Farnese (Italian: Carlo Farnese, Spanish: Carlos Farnese, German: Karl Farnese; 27 August 1545 – 7 October 1549), heir to the Duchy of Parma.
- Alexander Farnese (27 August 1545 – 3 December 1592), 3rd Duke of Parma; married Infanta Maria of Portugal and had issue.

== Coat of arms ==
Margaret of Austria, as Duchess of Florence and Parma, chose for her device a pearl shining from its shell, with the motto, Decus allatura coronae ("About to bring glory to the crown").

== Ancestry ==
Ancestors of Margaret of Parma

8. Maximilian I, Holy Roman Emperor
4. Philip I of Castile
9. Mary, Duchess of Burgundy
2. Charles V, Holy Roman Emperor
10. Ferdinand II of Aragon
5. Joanna I of Castile
11. Isabella I of Castile
1. Margaret, Duchess of Parma
6. Gilles Johann van der Gheynst
3. Johanna Maria van der Gheynst
7. Johanna van der Caye van Cocambi

== See also ==
- Geuzen
- Palazzo Madama, Rome
- Villa Madama

== Notes ==
Margaret of Parma Born: 5 July 1522 Died: 18 January 1586
Political offices
Preceded by Emmanuel Philibert, Duke of Savoy	Governor of the Habsburg Netherlands; 1559–1567	Succeeded by Fernando Álvarez de Toledo, 3rd Duke of Alba
Preceded by John of Austria	Governor of the Habsburg Netherlands; 1578–1582; Served alongside: Alexander Farnese, Duke of Parma	Succeeded by Peter Ernst I von Mansfeld-Vorderort
