= Philip de Lalaing, 3rd Count of Lalaing =

Philip 3rd Count of Lalaing
- Lalaing coat of arms
- Born: 1537
- Died: 24 May 1582
- Noble family: House of Lalaing
- Spouse: Margaret of Ligne
- Father: Charles II de Lalaing
- Mother: Margaret of Croÿ

Philip de Lalaing (Lallaing, France, 1537 – Mons, Belgium, 24 May 1582) was 3rd Count of Lalaing and Lord of Escornaix and Wavrin.

== Early life ==
He was the eldest son of Charles II de Lalaing and Margaret of Croÿ (died 1549). In 1574, at the beginning of the Eighty Years' War, he became stadtholder of Hainaut. First, he was loyal to the Spanish King, but in 1576 he supported the States-General of the Netherlands and the Union of Brussels (1577).

== Career ==
That year, Philip became commander in chief of the army of the States-General, but was decisively defeated in the Battle of Gembloux (1578). He was held responsible for the defeat by the Protestants, though he was not actually present at the battle. This and other disputes with the rebels made him sign Hainaut into the Union of Arras (January 1579), and reconcile himself with the King of Spain, under certain conditions. Philip served his King loyally the rest of his life.

== Personal life ==
Philip married Margaret of Ligne, daughter of Jean de Ligne. They only had one daughter, Margaret of Lalaing, who married with Florent of Berlaymont. Berlaymont inherited all Philip's titles.
