= Antoine de Lalaing, 3rd Count of Hoogstraeten =

Count of Hoogstraeten

Antoine II de Lalaing 3rd Count of Hoogstraeten
- Lalaing coat of arms
- Born: 1533
- Died: 1568 (aged 34–35)
- Noble family: House of Lalaing
- Spouse: Eleonora de Montmorency
- Father: Philip de Lalaing, 2nd Count of Hoogstraten

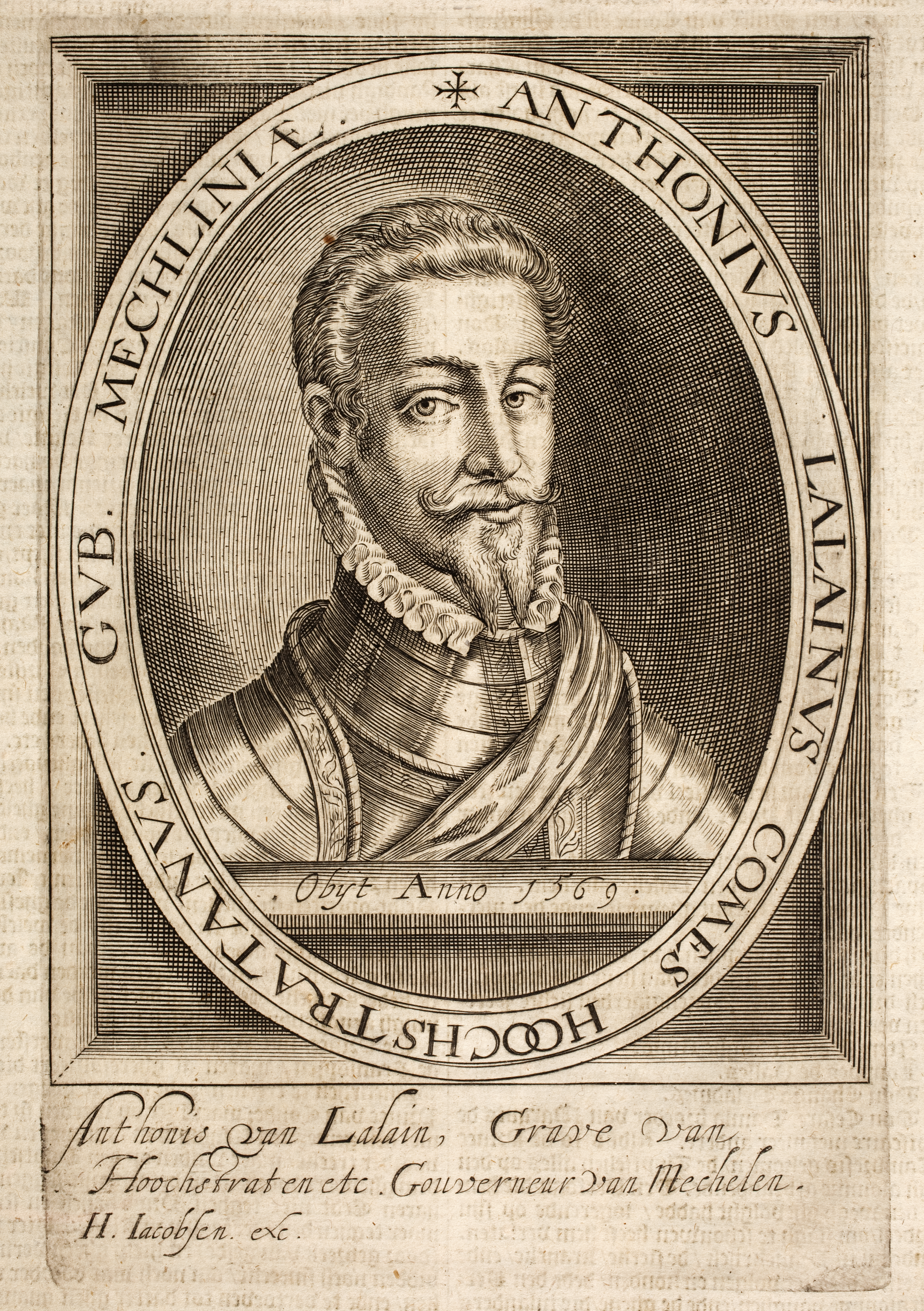
"Anthonis van Lalain". Emanuel van Meteren Historie.

Antoine II of Lalaing (1533–1568), 3rd count of Hoogstraten, was a patron and nobleman of the Southern Netherlands. He was the son of the second count Philip de Lalaing and his wife Anna of Rennenberg.

At the age of 22 he took possession of the Gelmelslot at Hoogstraten. He became governor of Mechelen at an early age, and in 1558 he was allowed to receive the Holy Sepulcher Knights to their first chapter. In 1560 he married Eleonora de Montmorency, sister of Philip de Montmorency. in Weert. They had a son, William of Lalaing who married Marie-Christine d Egmont, daughter of Lamoraal de Egmont.

In 1566 the Beeldenstorm broke out, and he replaced William of Orange as governor of Antwerp.

Like the counts Lamoraal, count of Egmont and Philip de Montmorency, count of Horn, Hoogstraten was summoned by the Duke of Alba to Brussels to appear before the Council of Troubles. Hoogstraten was on his way to Brussels when he heard that Egmont and Hoorn had been arrested in Brussels. He immediately turned around, took from his castle his most important possessions, and fled on horseback to Cologne. As a consequence, the Duke of Alba banished him, confiscated his possessions, and deprived him of all his rights and privileges, and his library was moved to Madrid.

Despite all this, Antoine II of Lalaing remained resolute in his support of William of Orange. In a military manoeuver near Tienen after the Battle of Jodoigne, where the army of William of Orange was forced by the Duke of Alba to retreat over the kleine Gete, he was hit in the foot by a shot from his own gun, and on 11 December 1568 he succumbed to his injuries.

== Sources ==
- Het Gelmelslot van Hoogstraten, website van het Penitentiair Schoolcentrum Hoogstraten, naar opzoekingen van de "Hoogstraatse Oudheidkundige Kring"
- P.C. Hooft, P.C. Hoofts Nederlandsche Historien, Vyfde Boek. (1642-1647). p198
