= Philip de Lalaing, 2nd Count of Hoogstraten =

Count of Hoogstraten, Stadtholder of Julich and Guelders

Philip de Lalaing
- 2nd Count of Hoogstraten
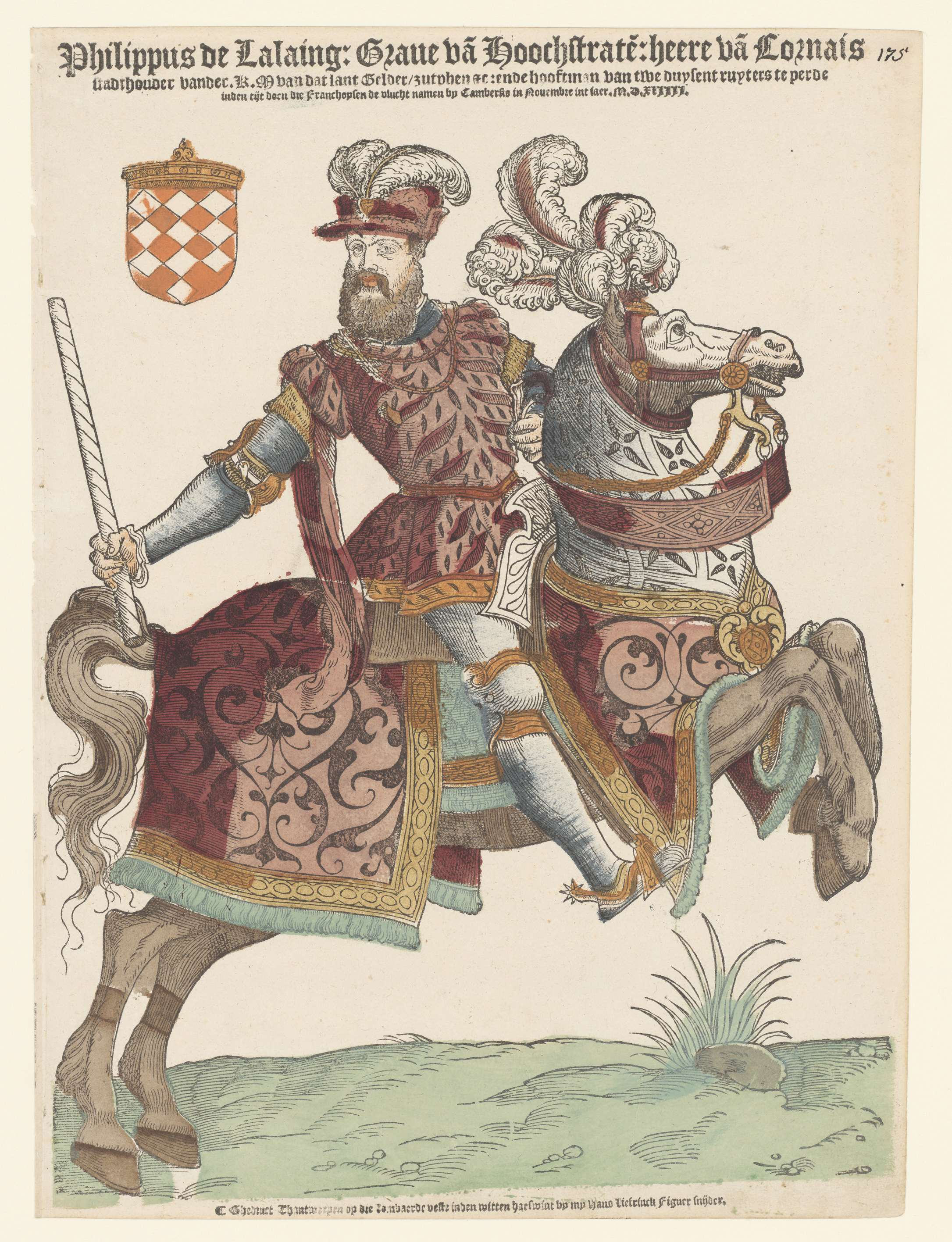
- Philip de Lalaing, Count of Hoogstraten, by Hans Liefrinck I (before 1550)

- Coat of arms
- Noble family: House of Lalaing
- Spouse: Anna of Rennenberg
- Issue: Antoine; George; Margaret; Barbara; Cornelia
- Father: Charles I de Lalaing
- Mother: Jacoba of Luxembourg

Philip de Lalaing, 2nd count of Hoogstraten (d. after 1555) was stadtholder of Jülich (1543) and Guelders (1544–1555).

== Life ==
A descendant from a noble family from Hainaut, Philip was the son of Charles I de Lalaing and Jacoba of Luxembourg. He inherited the title of count of Hoogstraten from his childless uncle Antoine de Lalaing. He was also lord of Escornaix and Ville.

In 1532 he married Anna of Rennenberg, the only daughter of William, count of Rennenberg and Cornelia of Culemborg. From this marriage he had two sons and three daughters:

- Antoine II de Lalaing, 3rd count of Hoogstraten;
- George de Lalaing, Count of Rennenberg
- Margaret of Lalaing (died 1598), married Philippe, Count of Ligne.
- Barbara of Lalaing, married in 1564 with Maximilian of East Frisia, son of Johan I of East Frisia
- Cornelia of Lalaing (died 1610), married William of Hamal

== Political career ==
In 1543 Philip became stadtholder of the recently conquered Jülich for a short time. When it became clear that this function would cease to exist because the lands of Jülich belonged to the Duke of Cleves, a different function was sought for Philip. Charles V, Holy Roman Emperor, proposed making Philip stadtholder of Utrecht. The Regent of the Low Countries, Mary of Hungary, disagreed: she felt the province of Utrecht could not be uncoupled from Holland.

Eventually Philip succeeded René of Châlon in 1544 as stadtholder of Guelders, but his power was significantly reduced by the regentes in favor of the central government in Brussels

Hoogstraten remained staunchly loyal to the emperor and was succeeded after his death in 1555 by the more headstrong Philip de Montmorency.
