= Egmont Museum =

Coordinates: 50.8698°N 3.8108°E

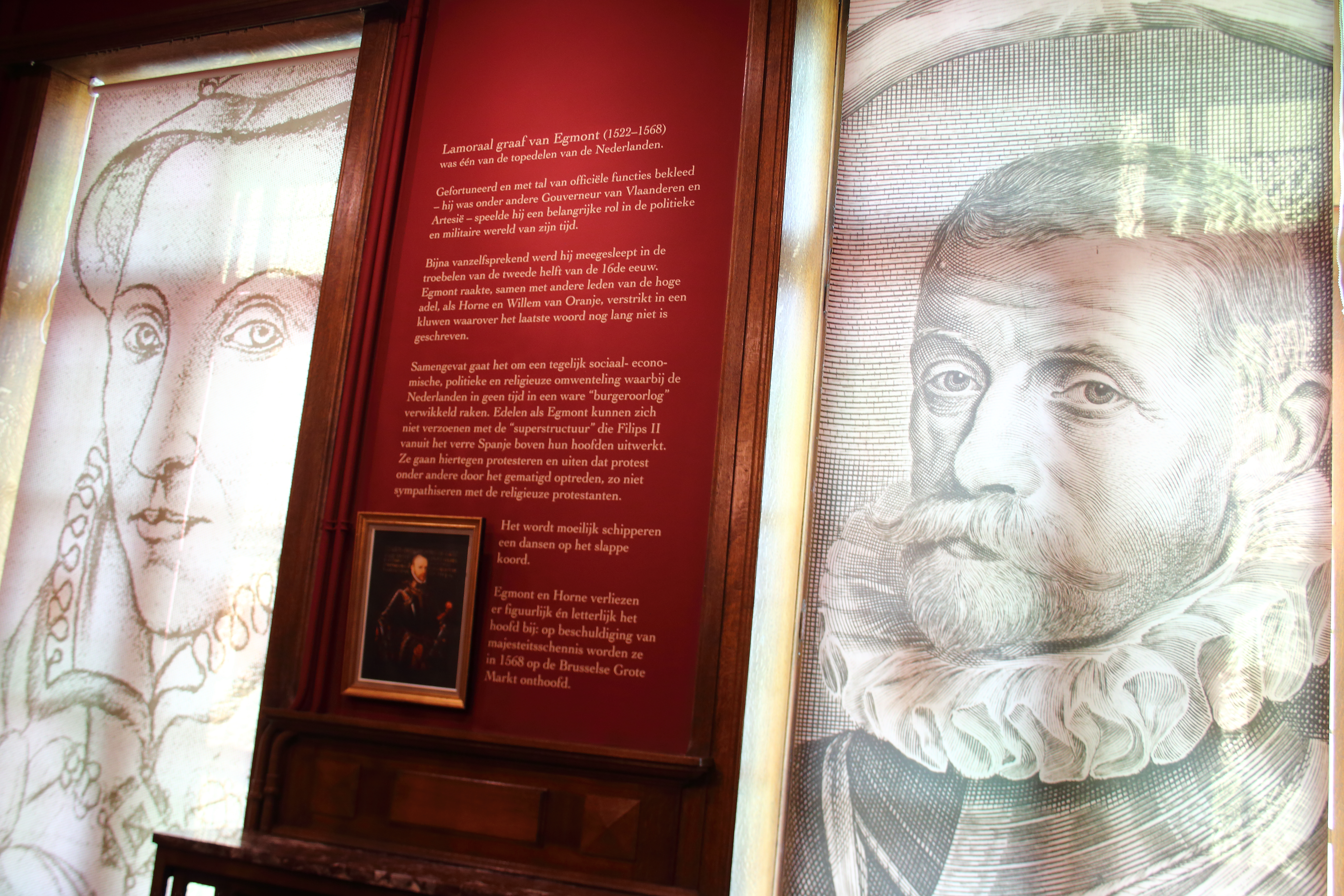
Egmont Museum, Zottegem

The Egmont Museum (Dutch: Egmontkamer) is a museum about Lamoral, Count of Egmont in the former Town Hall of Zottegem, Belgium.

The museum was opened in 2018 for the commemoration of the 450th anniversary of the beheading of Lamoral on Grand-Place/Grote Markt in Brussels in 1568. It showcases different historical items relating to Egmont such as paintings, etchings, coins and floor tiling from Egmont Castle.

Furthermore, several objects from Egmont's crypt are shown, such as the 16th-century burial plaque of his wife Sabina, the plaque dating from the rediscovery of the crypt in 1804, the embalmed hearts of Lamoral and his sons Charles and Philip and 3D prints of Egmont's and Sabina's skulls.

Since 1984, the former Town Hall also houses a shrine containing the cleft cervical vertebra of Lamoral. Two paintings of Egmont are on display: Last honours to Egmont and Horne (1882) by Louis Gallait and Egmond castle in Egmond aan den Hoef (around 1570) by Dutch master Gillis De Saen.

== Images ==
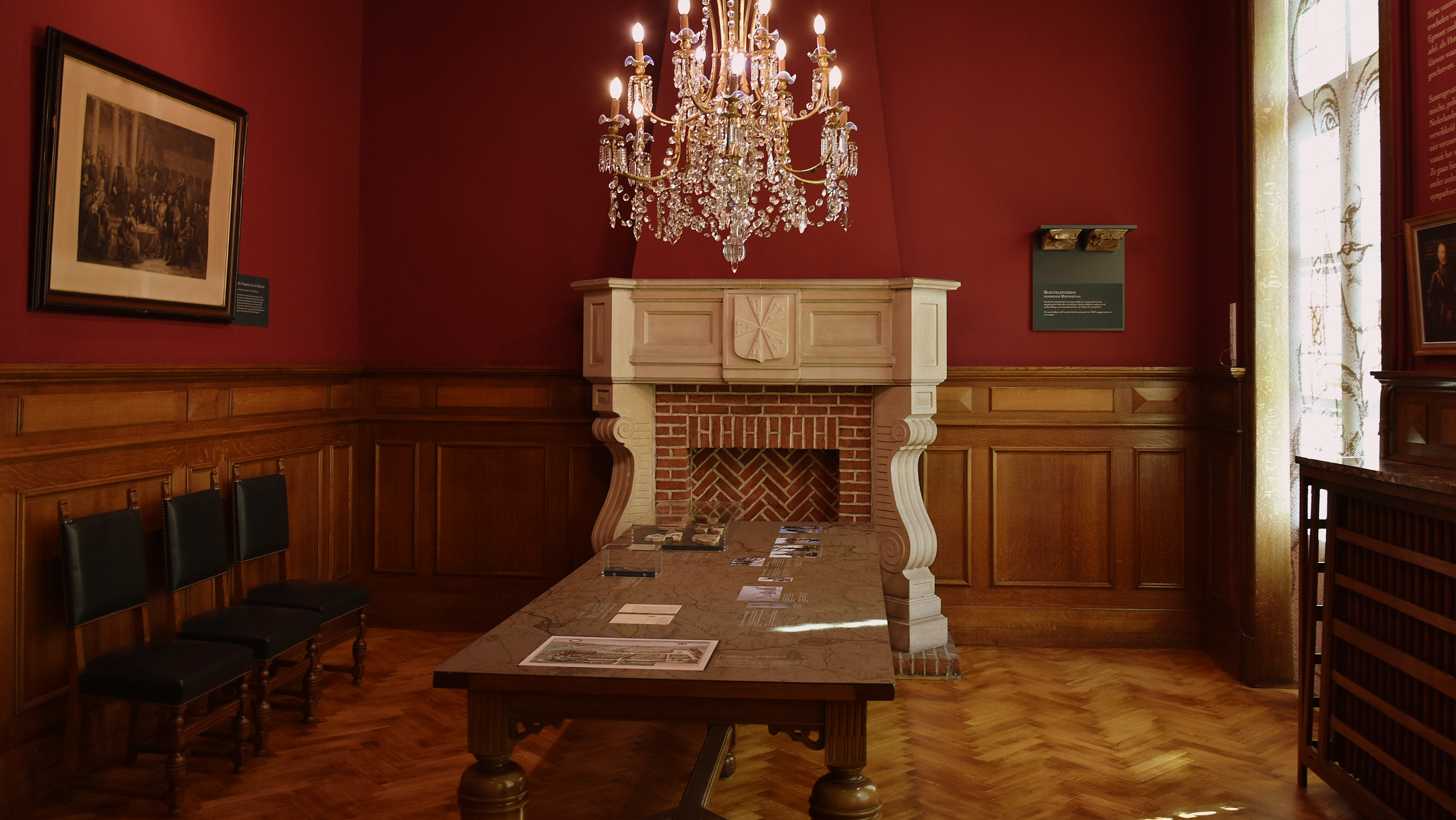
Interior of the Egmont Museum in the former Town Hall of Zottegem

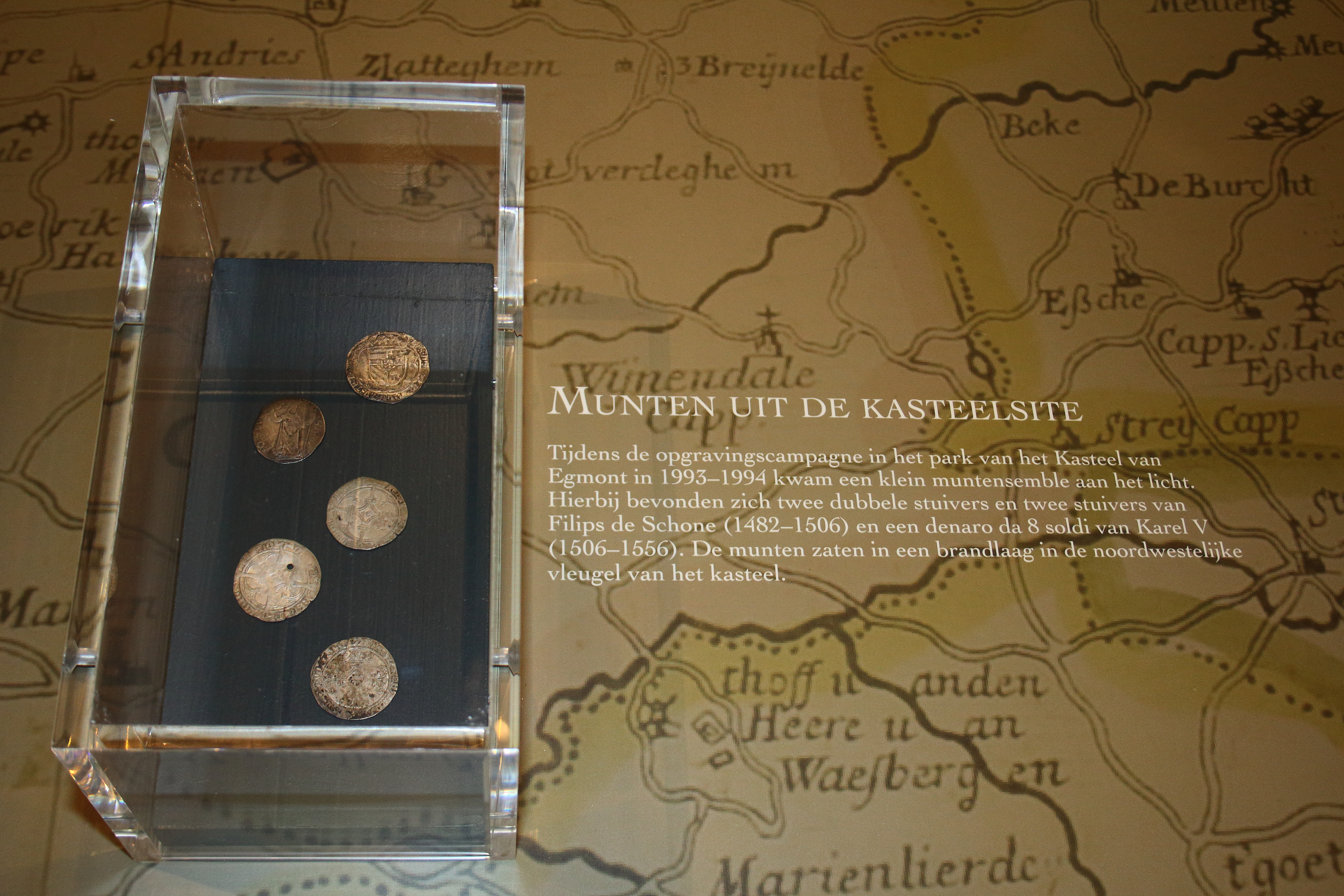
Coins excavated in a burnt layer in the northwest wing of Egmont Castle

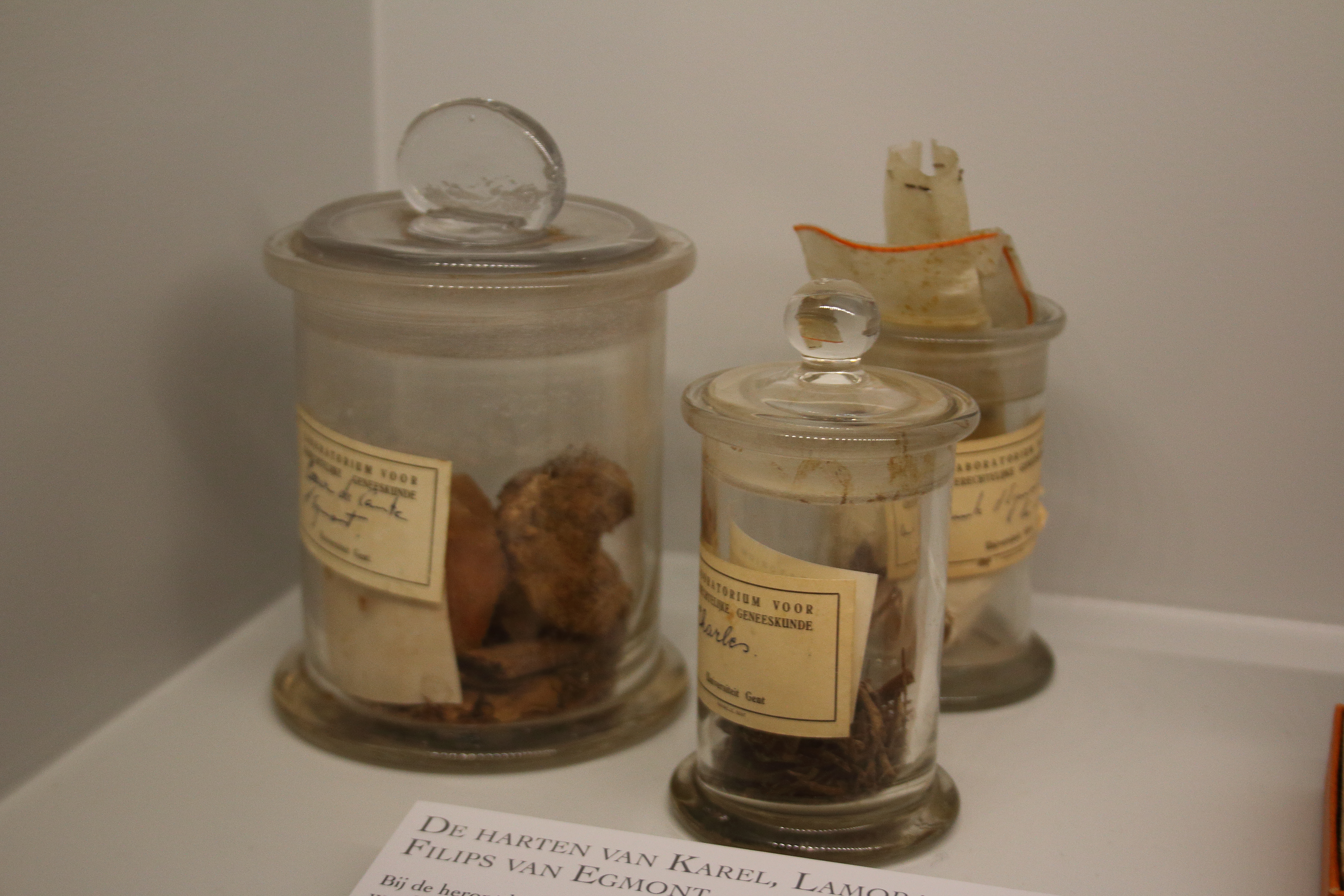
Embalmed hearts of Lamoral and his sons Charles and Philip, from Egmont's crypt

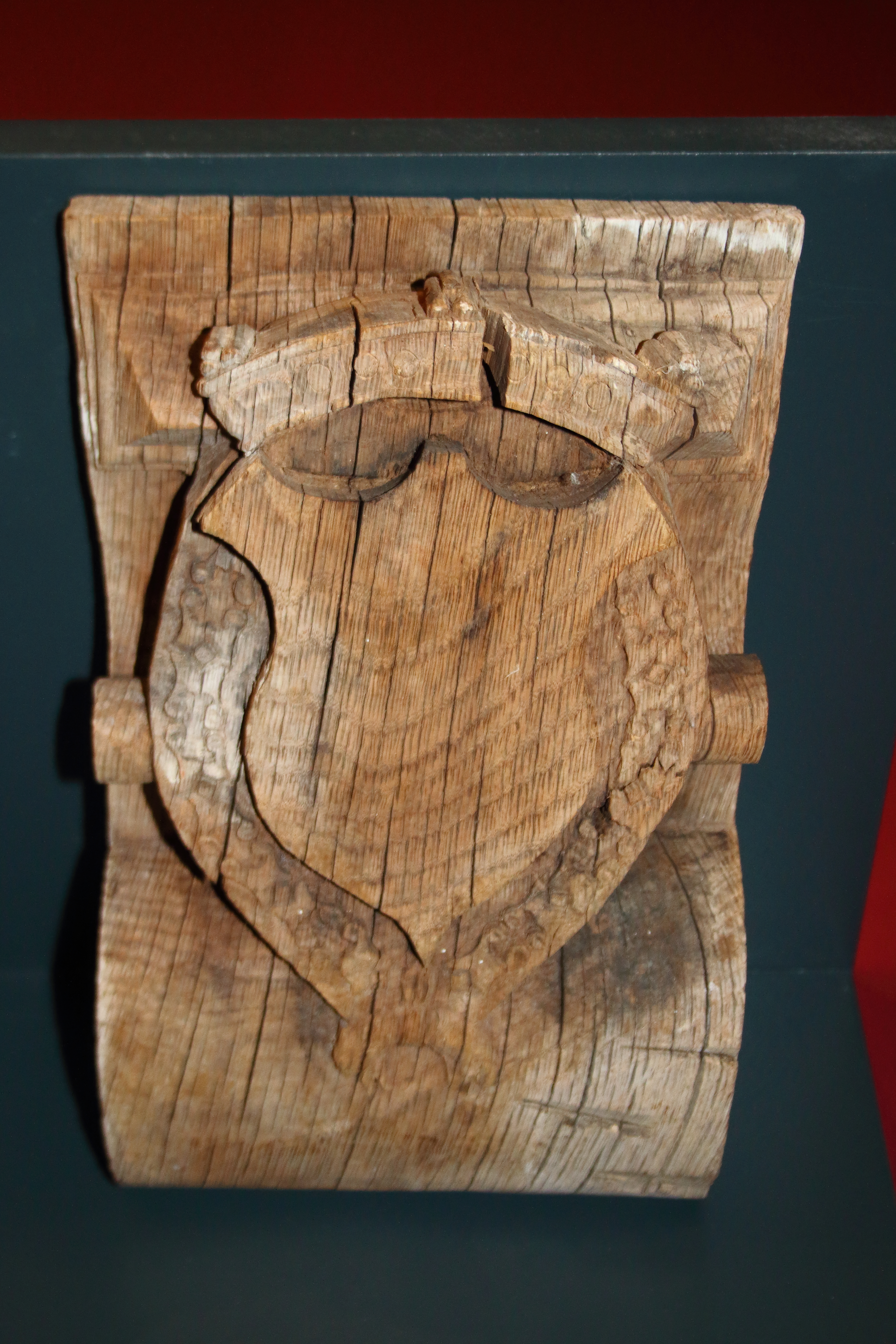
Key piece from the Knights' Room of Egmont Castle with Egmont's shield
