= Charles II of Egmont =

Coat of arms of the House of Egmont.

Charles, Count of Egmont (Château de Lahamaide, 1567 – The Hague, 18 January 1620) was the 7th Count of Egmont, prince of Gavere and Lord of Zottegem.

== Biography ==
He was the third son of Sabina of Palatinate-Simmern and Lamoral, Count of Egmont, who was beheaded by the Spanish in 1568 in Brussels. He never knew his father. When his two elder brothers, Philip and Lamoral II, died without children, he became the 7th Count of Egmont in 1617.

Like his brothers, he was loyal to King Philip II of Spain, who had approved the execution of their father. He was sent as Spanish envoy to Germany and Denmark on several occasions.

Charles was appointed Knight in the Order of the Golden Fleece by Philip III of Spain in 1599.
In the same year, he became Stadtholder and Governor of the County of Namur and remained so until his death.

He recovered a portion of his father's confiscated possessions. From his sister Sabina, he inherited the rights to the Dutch possessions of the House of Egmont. Charles sold these rights to the States of Holland and West Friesland in 1619.

After his death in The Hague in 1620, Charles II of Egmont was buried in Armentières. Charles's heart is on display in the Egmont Museum of Zottegem Town Hall. The heart-shaped lead casket is located in the Egmont Crypt of the Church of the Assumption of Our Lady, Zottegem.

=== Marriage and children ===
Charles married Maria van Lens, Baroness of Aubignies. They had 4 children :

- Louis of Egmont (1600–1654), 8th Count of Egmont, had issue
- Magdalena (died 1663), married Alexander of Arenberg and Chimay
- Alberta (1593–1621), married René de Renesse, 1st Count of Warfusée
- Philippa Sabina, never married.
