= Sabina of Bavaria =

Sabina of Bavaria may refer to:

- Sabina of Bavaria, Duchess of Württemberg (1492–1564)
- Sabina of Palatinate-Simmern (1528–1578)
