= Alexandre, Prince of Arenberg and Chimay =

Alexander of Arenberg (Brussels, 15 September 1590 – Wesel, 16 August 1629) was a Belgian nobleman, 7th Prince of Chimay, Prince of the Holy Roman Empire, military leader of the Spanish Netherlands, and founder of the line of Princes of Chimay of the House of Arenberg.

== Biography ==
Alexander of Croÿ-Chimay d'Arenberg was the third son of Prince Charles de Ligne, 2nd Prince of Arenberg and Anne de Croÿ (1563–1635), Duchess of Aarschot and 6th Princess of Chimay.

In 1614, he inherited numerous estates and noble titles from his mother, including Prince of Chimay, Count of Beaumont, Lord of Comines, Fumay, Avesnes and Seninghem. In 1617, when his father-in-law Charles II of Egmont died, he became semi-sovereign lord of Weert by his wife's inheritance.

In the funerary procession of Archduke Albert of Austria in 1622, he carried the deceased's sword of sovereignty.

He became a Knight in the Order of the Golden Fleece in 1624.

An officer in the Spanish Army of Flanders, he participated in the Eighty Years' War. He raised a German infantry regiment with which he took part in the Palatinate campaign (1620-1621), the unsuccessful Siege of Bergen op Zoom (1622) and the successful siege of Breda (1624–1625).

Between 1626 and 1628 he fought in Germany in support of Tilly's army. He was killed in 1629, when the Dutch conquered the city of Wesel in the Duchy of Cleves, after the Invasion of the Veluwe (1629).

=== Marriage and children ===
In 1613, Alexander married Magdalene of Egmont (1596-1663), daughter of Count Charles II of Egmont and Maria de Lance. They had four children:

- Isabella (1615-1660), married in 1636 Marquis Ludovico Gonzaga (1599-1660), of the House of the Counts of San Martino.
- Anna Catharina (1616-1658), married to Eugène de Hénin, 6th Count of Bossu.
- Albert (1618-1648), 8th Prince of Chimay. In 1635, he married Clara Eugenia of Arenberg (1611-1660), daughter of Philip of Arenberg. The marriage was childless.
- Philippe (1619–1675), 9th Prince of Chimay. In 1642, he married Théodore-Maximilienne de Gavre, daughter of Pierre-Ernest de Gavre, Count of Frésin. Father of Ernest-Dominique of Arenberg, 10th Prince of Chimay.
