= Church of the Assumption of Our Lady, Zottegem =

Church of the Assumption of Our Lady
- Dutch: Onze-Lieve-Vrouw-Hemelvaartkerk
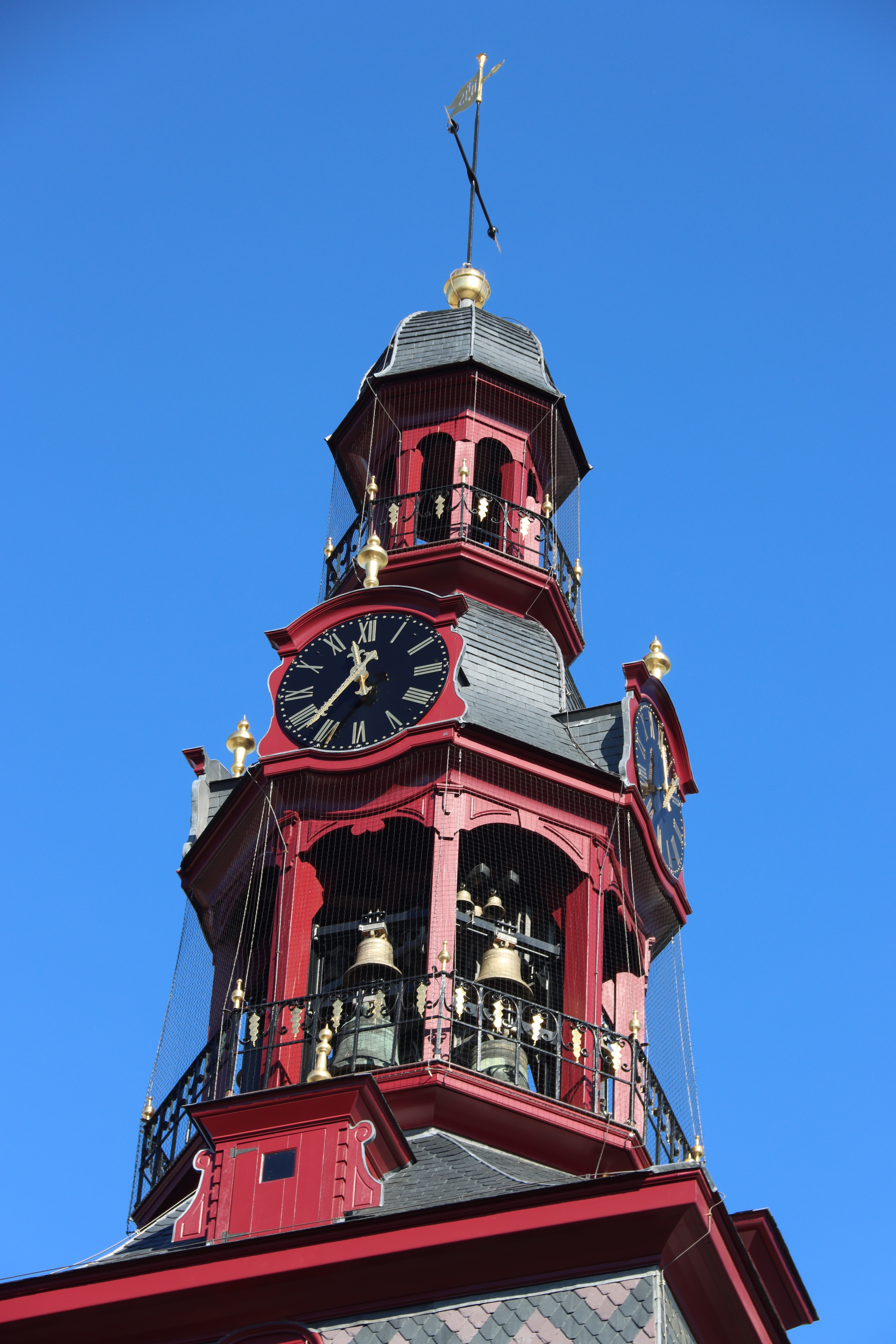
- Campanile-style bell tower dating from 1750
- Church of the Assumption of Our Lady
- Location: Zottegem
- Country: Belgium
- Denomination: Catholic

Architecture
- Style: Gothic architecture

Administration
- Diocese: Roman Catholic Diocese of Ghent

The Church of the Assumption of Our Lady (Dutch: Onze-Lieve-Vrouw-Hemelvaartkerk) is a Catholic church located in Zottegem, Flanders, Belgium.

== History ==
The first church on the market square was built in the 12th century to replace the castle chapel at Egmont Castle as parish church. In 1162 the Jus patronatus was awarded to the abbey of Mont-Saint-Martin (which had a priory in nearby Strijpen). During the 14th century the roman church was rebuilt into a gothic-style church and the jus patronatus was reawarded to the local noblemen (who resided at egmont Castle). The gothic church was a one-aisled church in the form of a cross compounded by an octagonal crossing tower.

In 1561 Lamoral, Count of Egmont commissioned a tomb made of marble, jasper and alabaster for his mother Francisca of Luxembourg. The church was heavily damaged by a fire in 1564. The remains of Lamoral himself were added to that crypt (the forerunner of the present-day Egmont's crypt) in 1568 after he was beheaded on Brussels' Grand-Place/Grote Markt. His wife Sabina of Bavaria († 1578) and his sons Philip († 1590) and Charles († 1620) were also buried there. During the Eighty Years' War the church was destroyed by the protestant Geuzen led by François de la Noue. The damage was repaired between 1611 and 1615. In 1645 and 1658 French troops damaged the church building.

In 1750 a new tower was erected on the west side, a campanile tower containing a carillon. A wooden beam in the tower reads: Desen torren is door my ghemaekt Gillis Speelman, Meester Temmerman binnen de stadt Gendt - Anno 1750 (This tower has been made by me, Gillis Speelman, master carpenter at the city of Ghent - Anno 1750). The western façade was enlarged and a pediment was added; two side aisles were added. In 1762 a sacristy was added in Balegem sandstone at the side of the market square. The tombs of Lamoral, count of Egmont and his family were rediscovered by accident in 1804. In 1855 another sacristy in brick was added at the side of the Zavel square. The new Egmont's crypt was inaugurated in 1857. Between 1871 en 1877 Jean-Baptiste Bethune designed stained-glass windows for the church. In 1886 the façade was rebuilt in Luxembourg stone and 14 stained-glass windows were added. The organ (made by the Van Peteghem family) dating from 1784 was restored in 1872 (by the Joris brothers from Ronse) and again in 1931.

In 1980 and 2019 the interior of the church was repainted and restored. Between 2023 and 2025 the roof was renovated and the bell tower was dismantled to be restored and rebuilt piece by piece.

The church has been a listed monument since 1974.

== Carillon ==
The first carillon in the Zottegem campanile tower dates from 1750. Bell-founder Joris Dumery created 49 bells in 1750. From 1867 on the carillon was enlarged by adding twelve bells made by Leuven-based bell-founder Severinus Van Aerschodt. In 1925 four new bells were added by Aalst-based bell-founder Karel De Mette and four bigger ones by bell-founder Omer Michaux. In 1961 the city council decided to install a full carillon containing 49 bells. Fourteen original bells were kept (11 by Dumery daring from 1750, 2 by Van Aerschodt dating from 1867 and one by Michaux dating from 1925) and 35 new ones were created in 1963 by the Dutch bell-foundry Petit & Fritsen. The original carillon drum by Dumery was transferred to the Royal Carillon School "Jef Denyn" museum.

Between 2023 and 2024 the Zottegem carillon was renovated. Royal Eijsbouts bell foundry removed the bells from the tower to restore them. Twenty-six of the 49 bells were refounded.

== Gallery ==
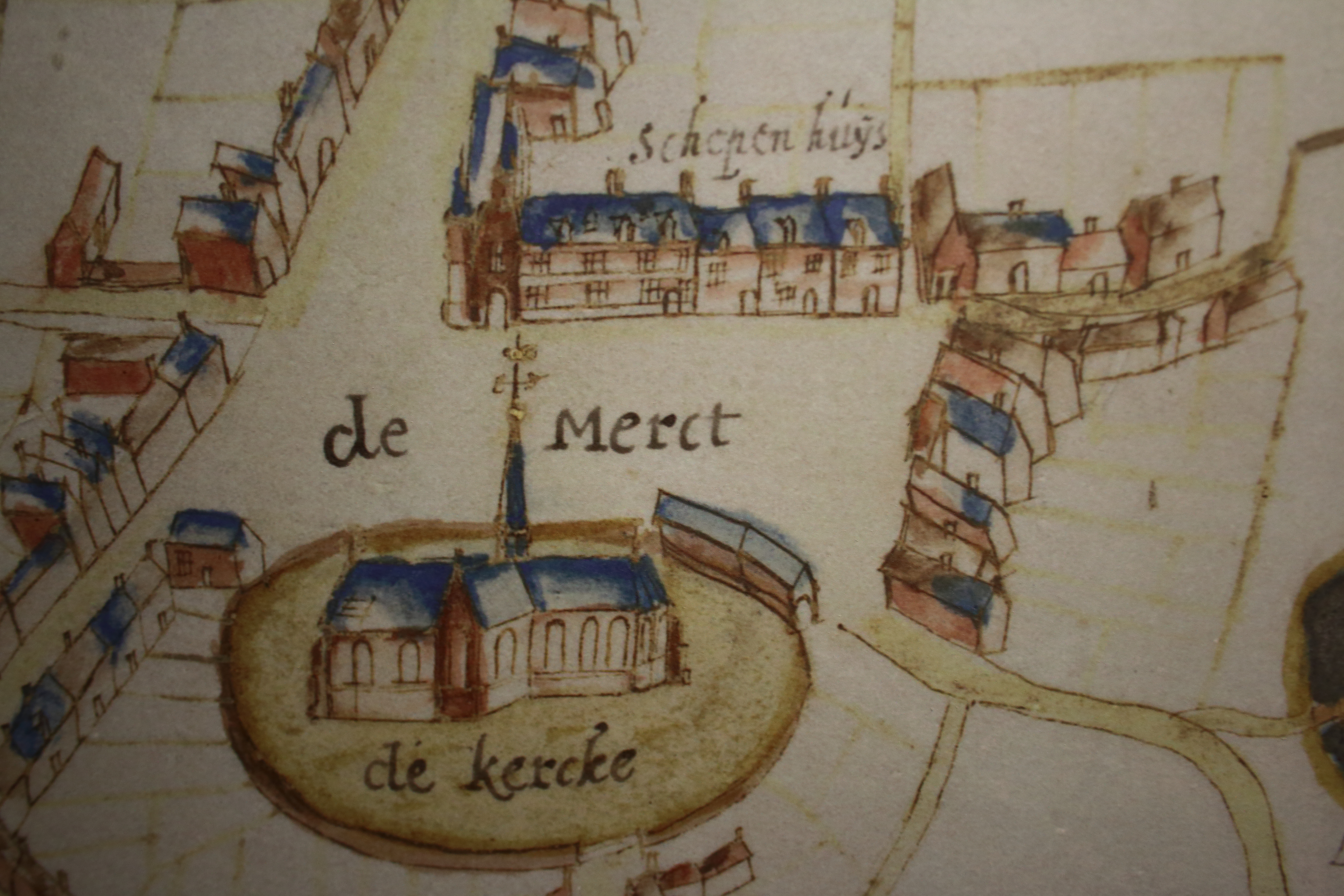
The church in 1629

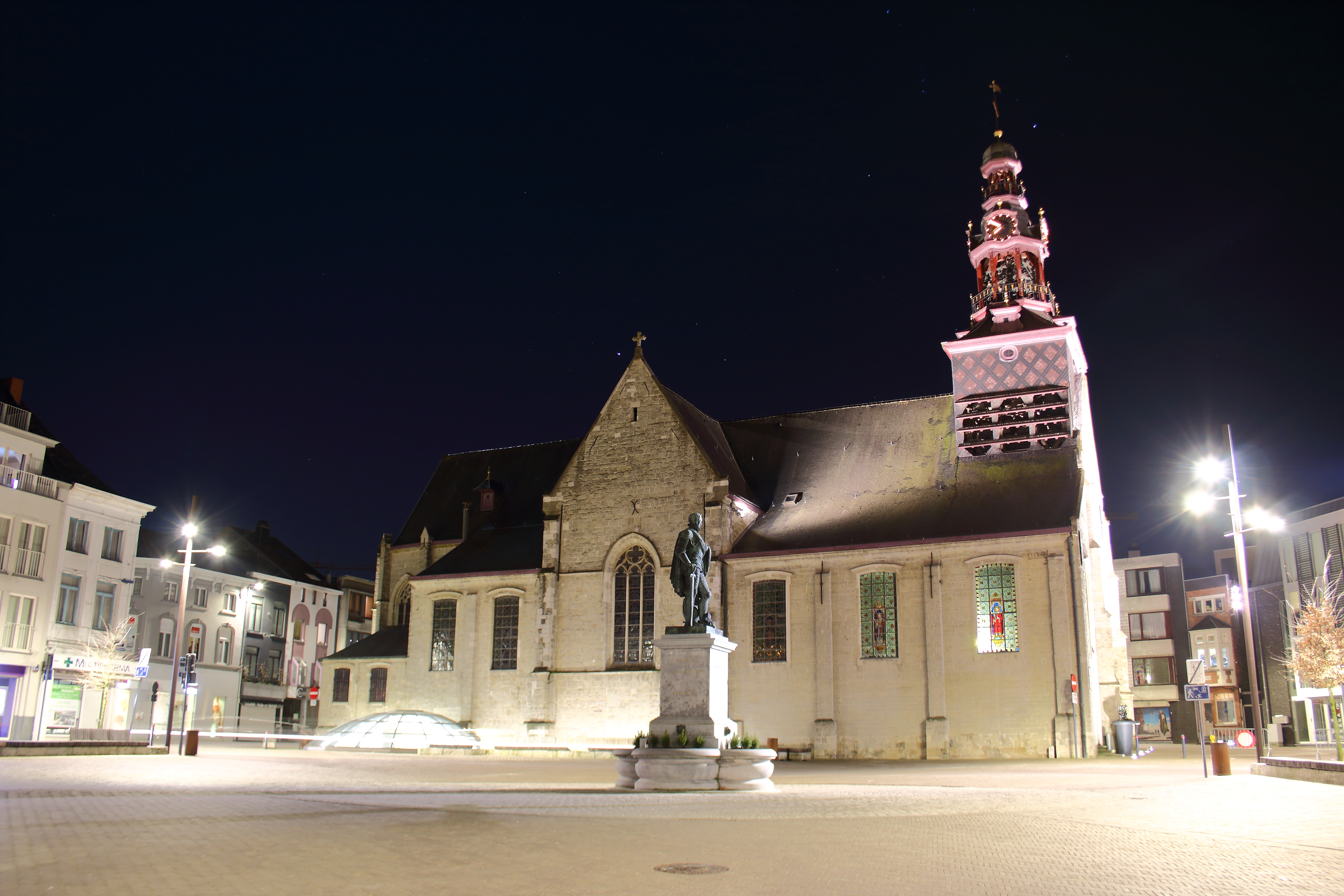
Church building

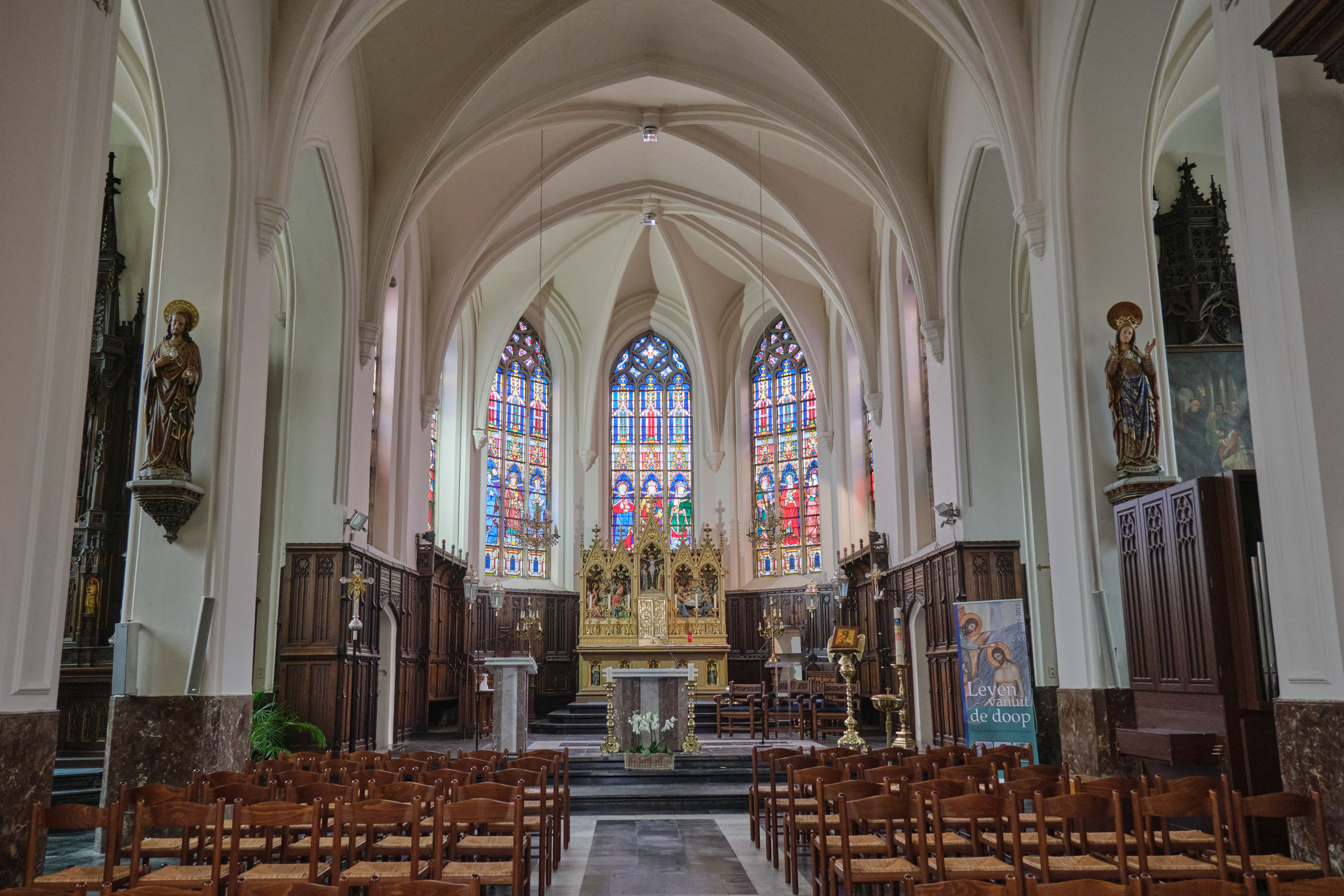
Interior

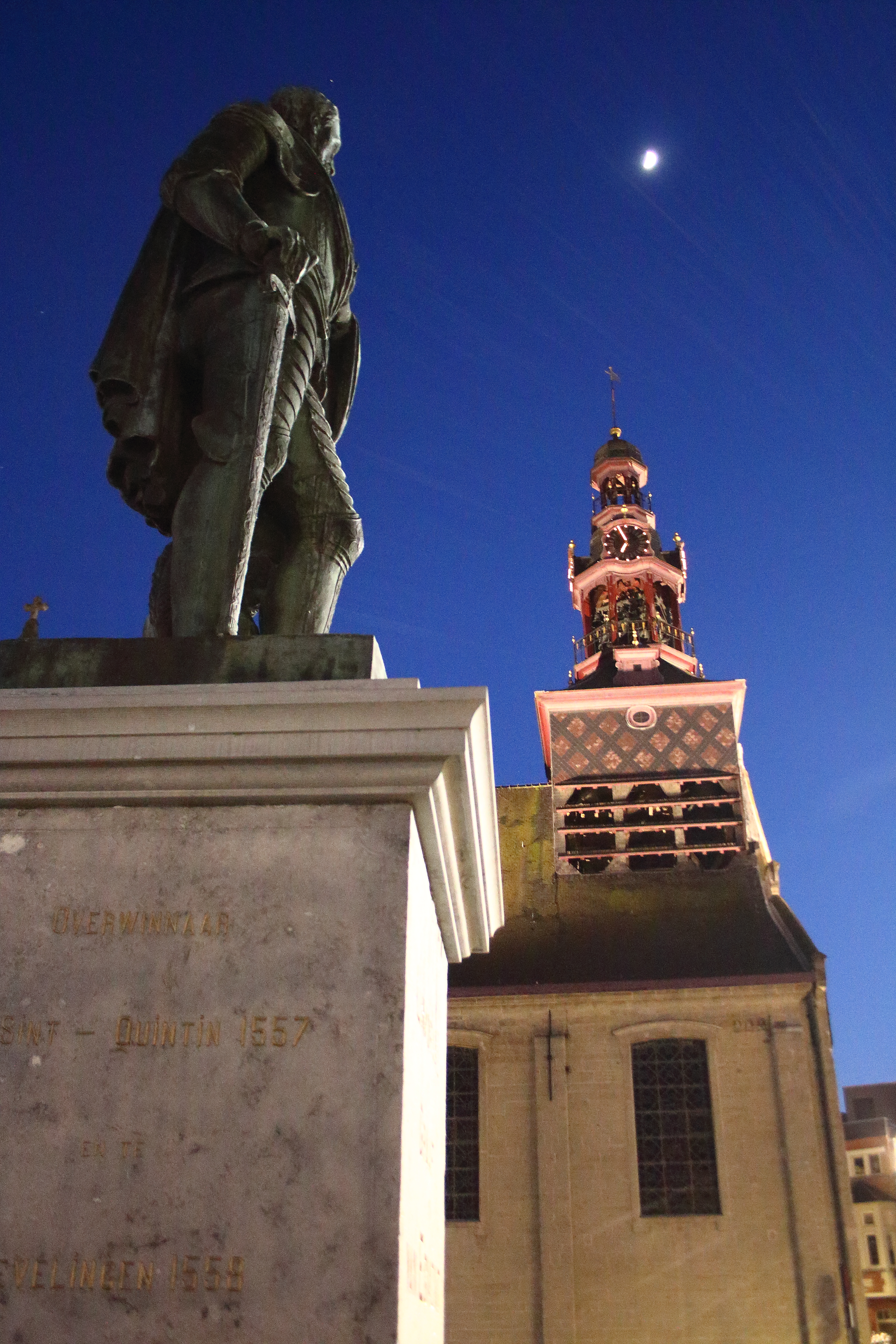
Church and statue of Egmont

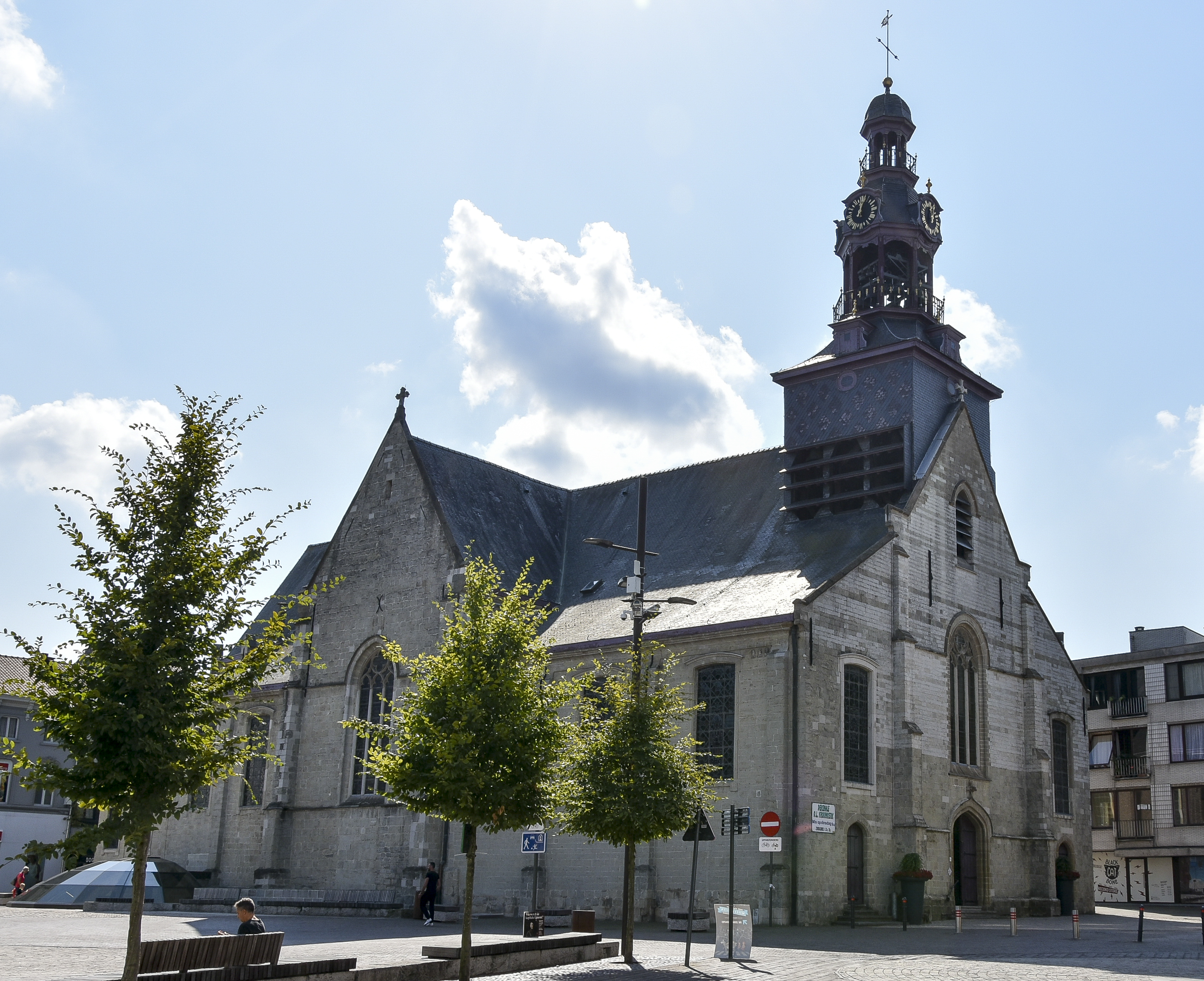
Church building

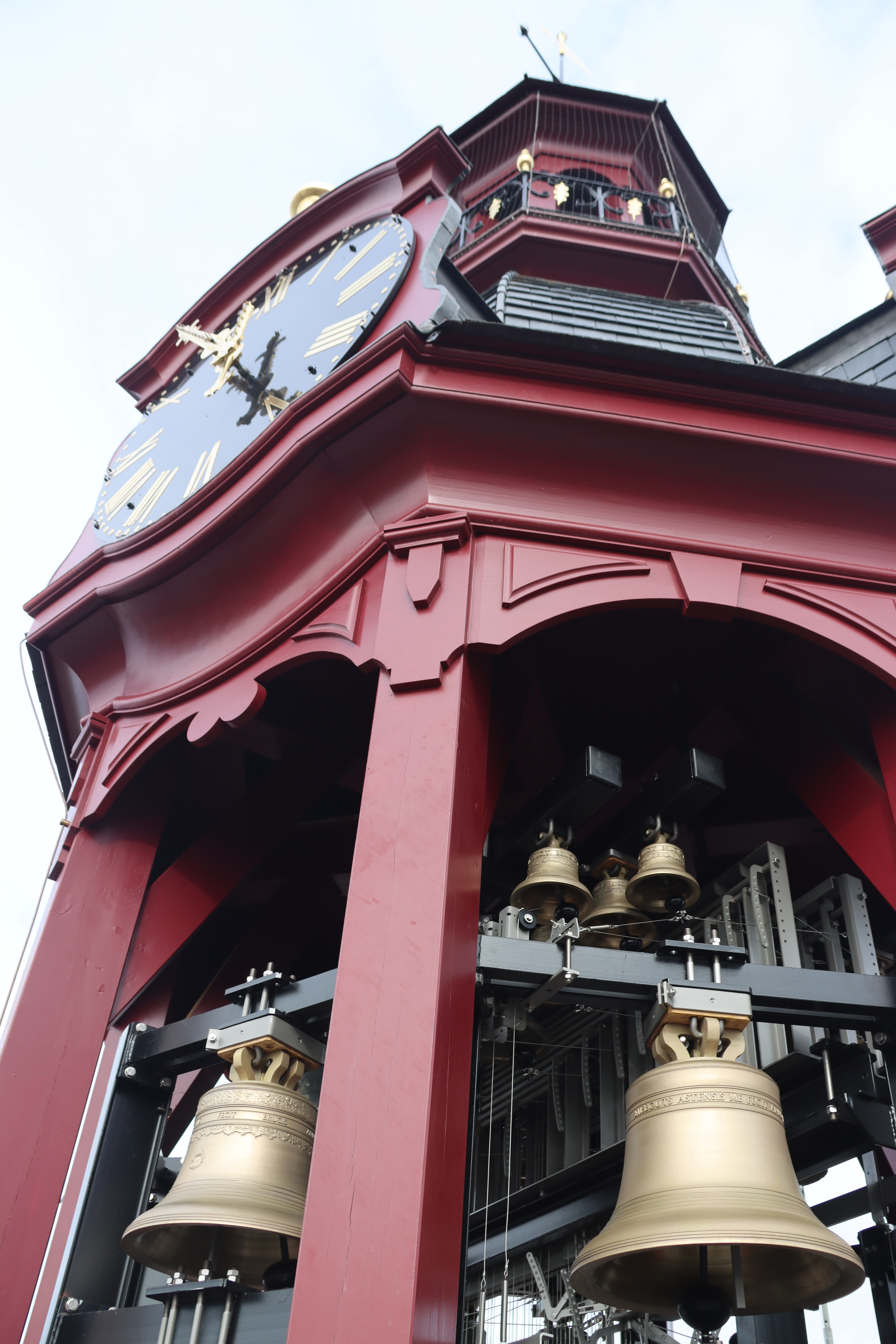
Carillon

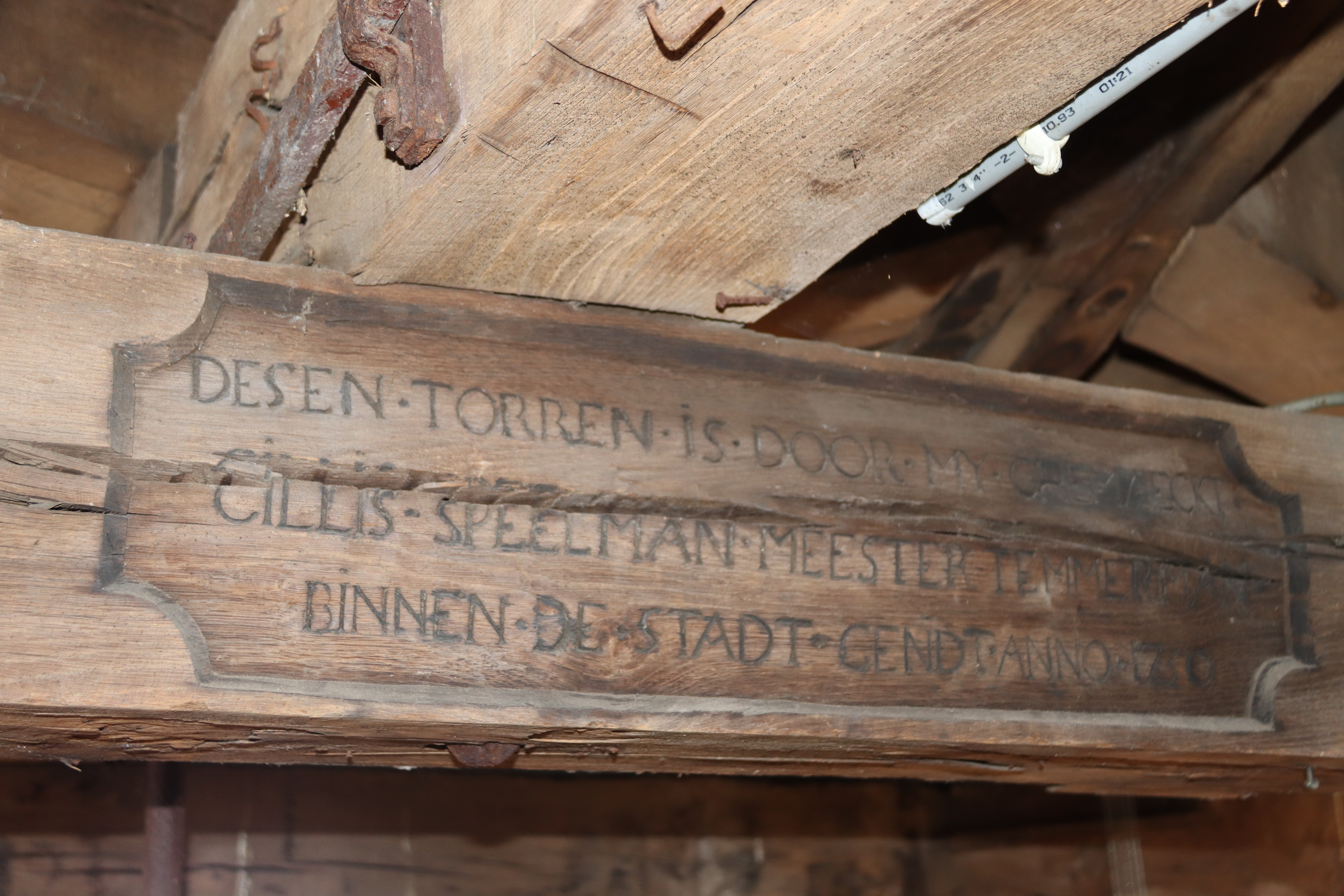
Beam inscription dating from 1750

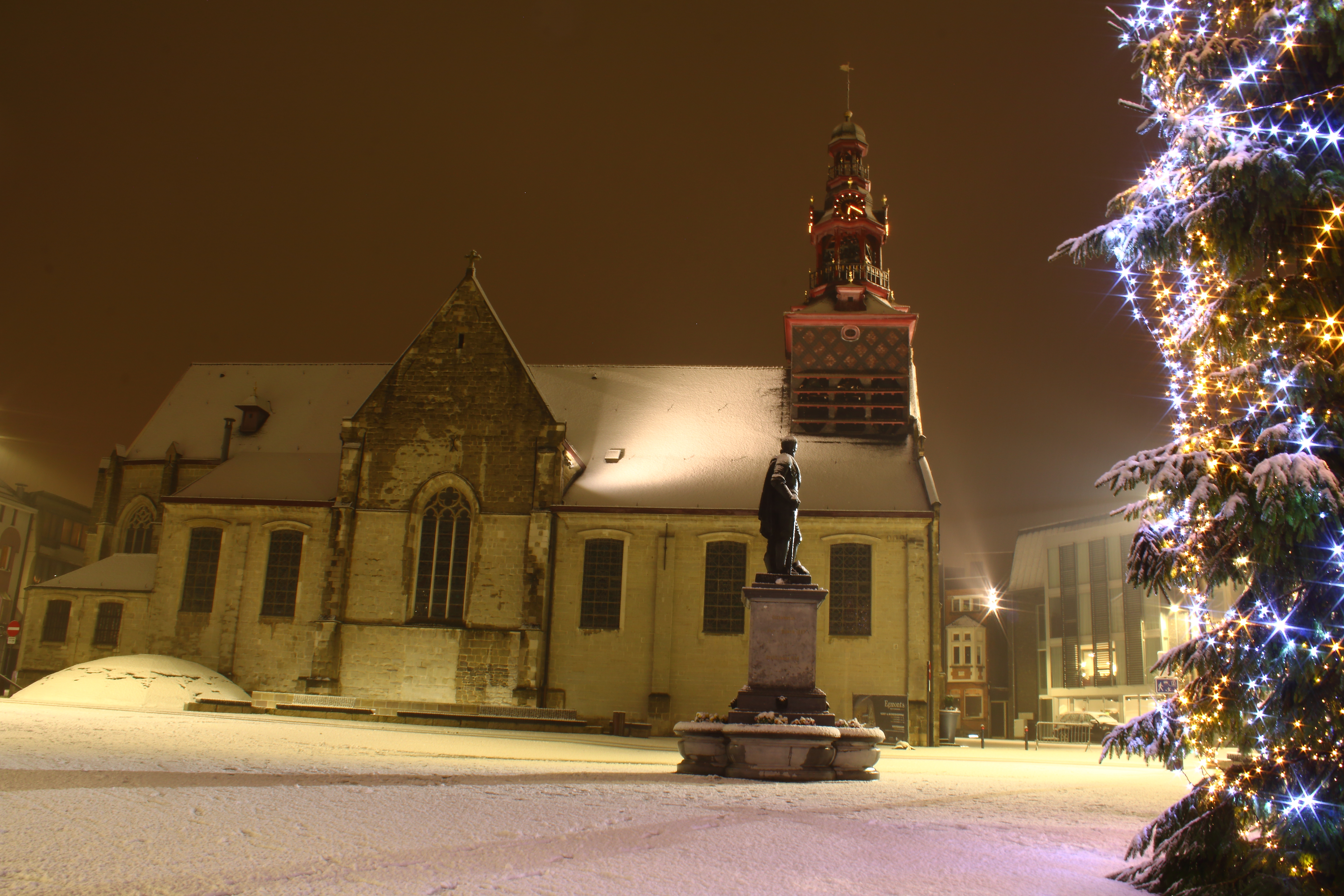
Church building
