= Egmont's crypt =

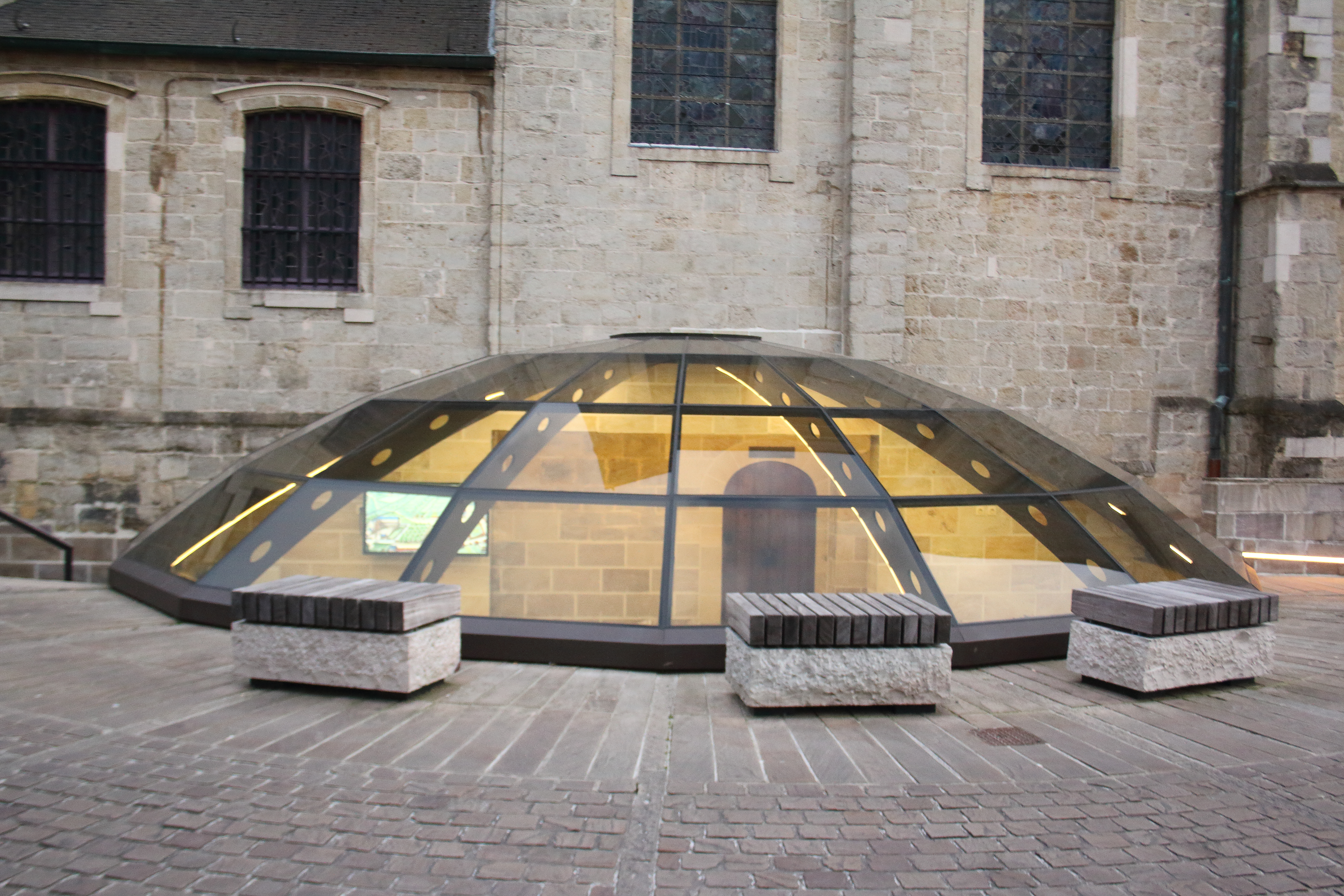
Egmont's crypt in 2020

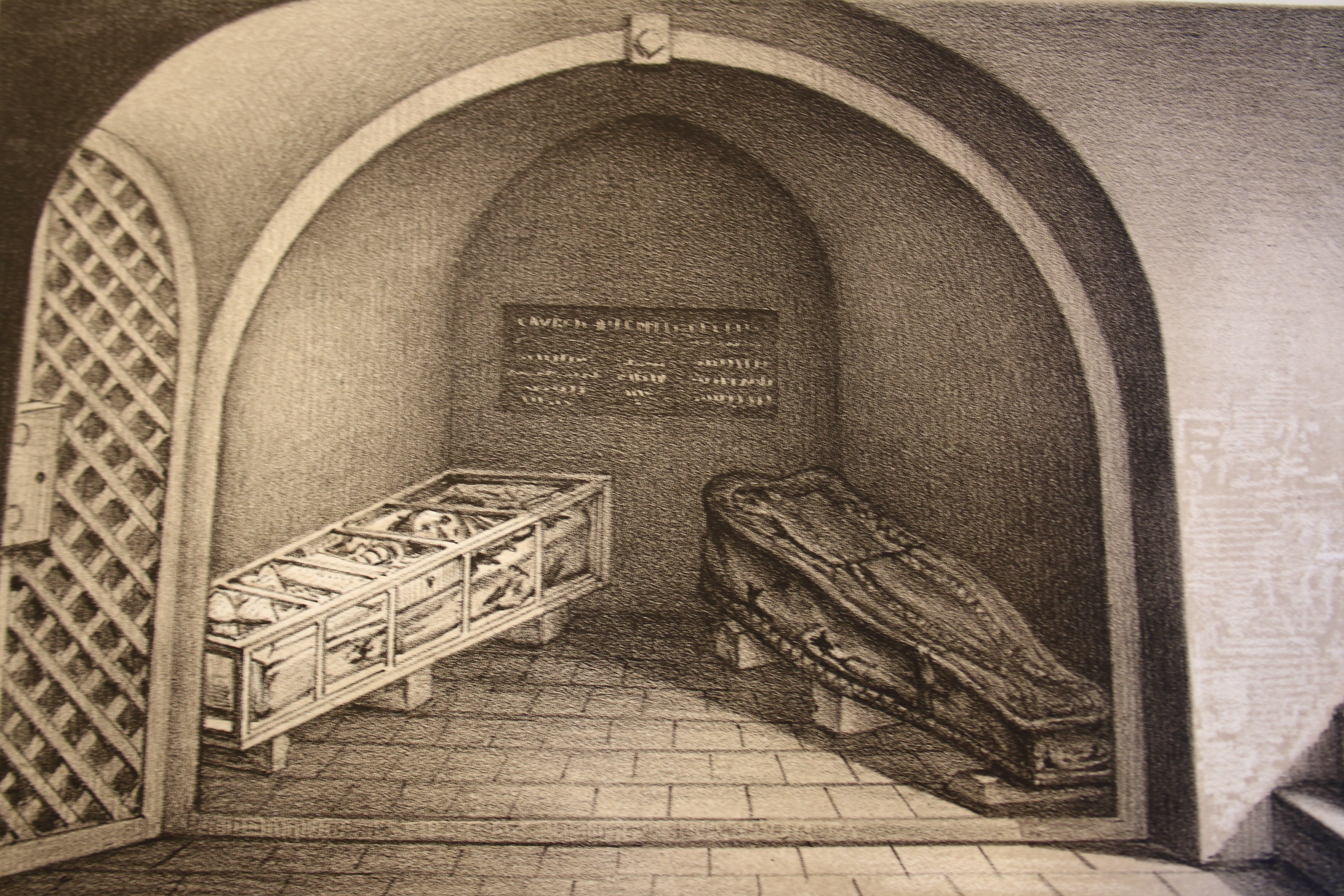
Egmont's crypt in 1869

Egmont's crypt (Dutch: Egmontcrypte) is a crypt on the market square in Zottegem, Belgium. The crypt contains the remains of Lamoral, Count of Egmont and his wife Sabina of Bavaria.

== History ==
Around 1563, Lamoral had a burial crypt built underneath the Church of the Assumption of Our Lady for his grandfather and mother. The remains of Lamoral himself were added to that crypt in 1568 after he was beheaded on Brussels' Grand-Place/Grote Markt. His wife Sabina of Bavaria († 1578) and his sons Philip († 1590) and Charles († 1620) were also buried there.

The crypt was used until the 17th century after which it fell into oblivion. In 1804, the graves were rediscovered by chance. They were transferred in 1857 to a newly built crypt, which was restored in 1952. The leaden coffins were enveloped in bronze sarcophagi. In 1954, the remains underwent a conservation treatment. In 2016, a glass dome was added to the crypt. In 2017, new genetic research brought to the fore that Egmont's remains had not been damaged by the Spaniards directly after his beheading, but many centuries later.

== Images ==
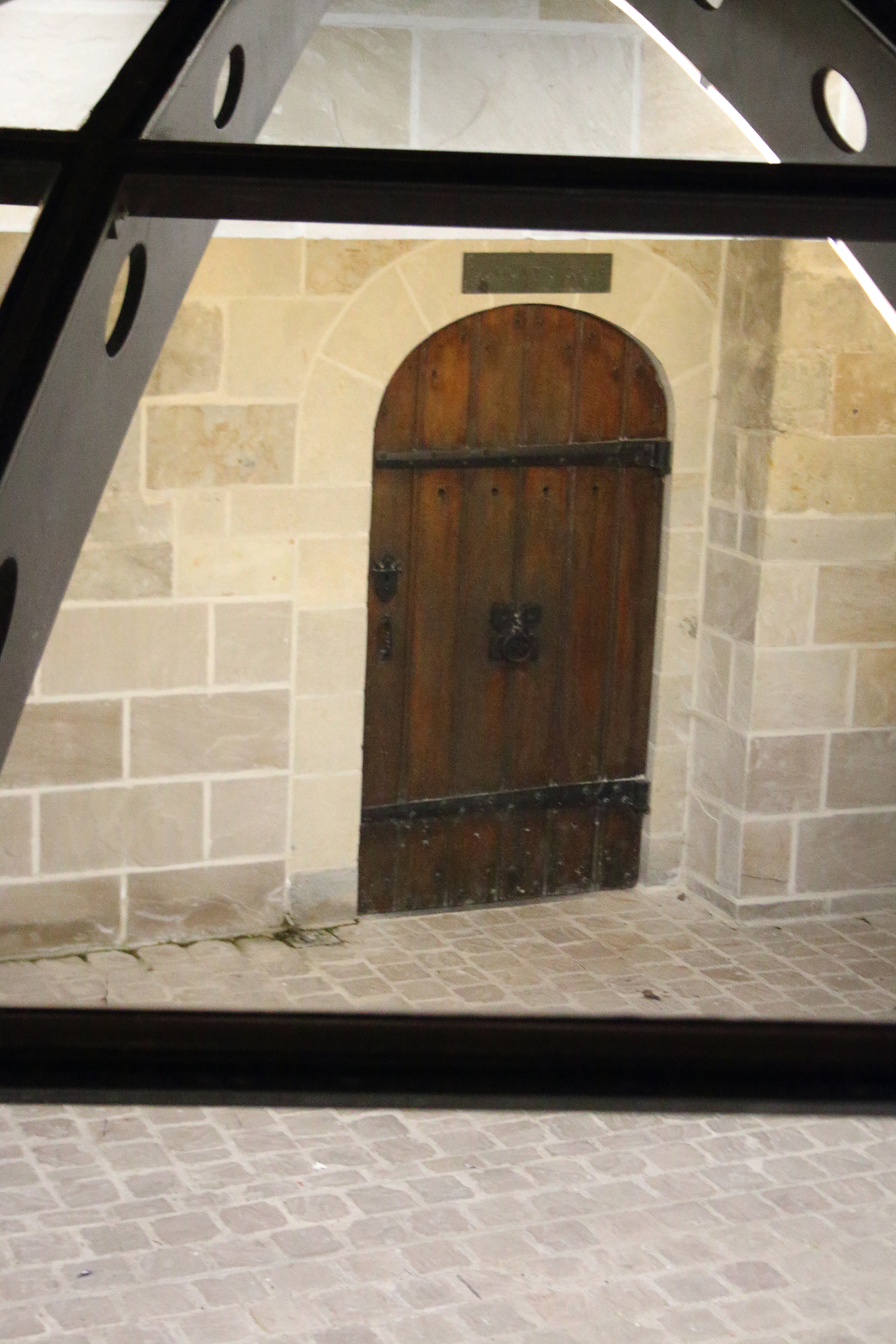
Glass dome of Egmont's crypt

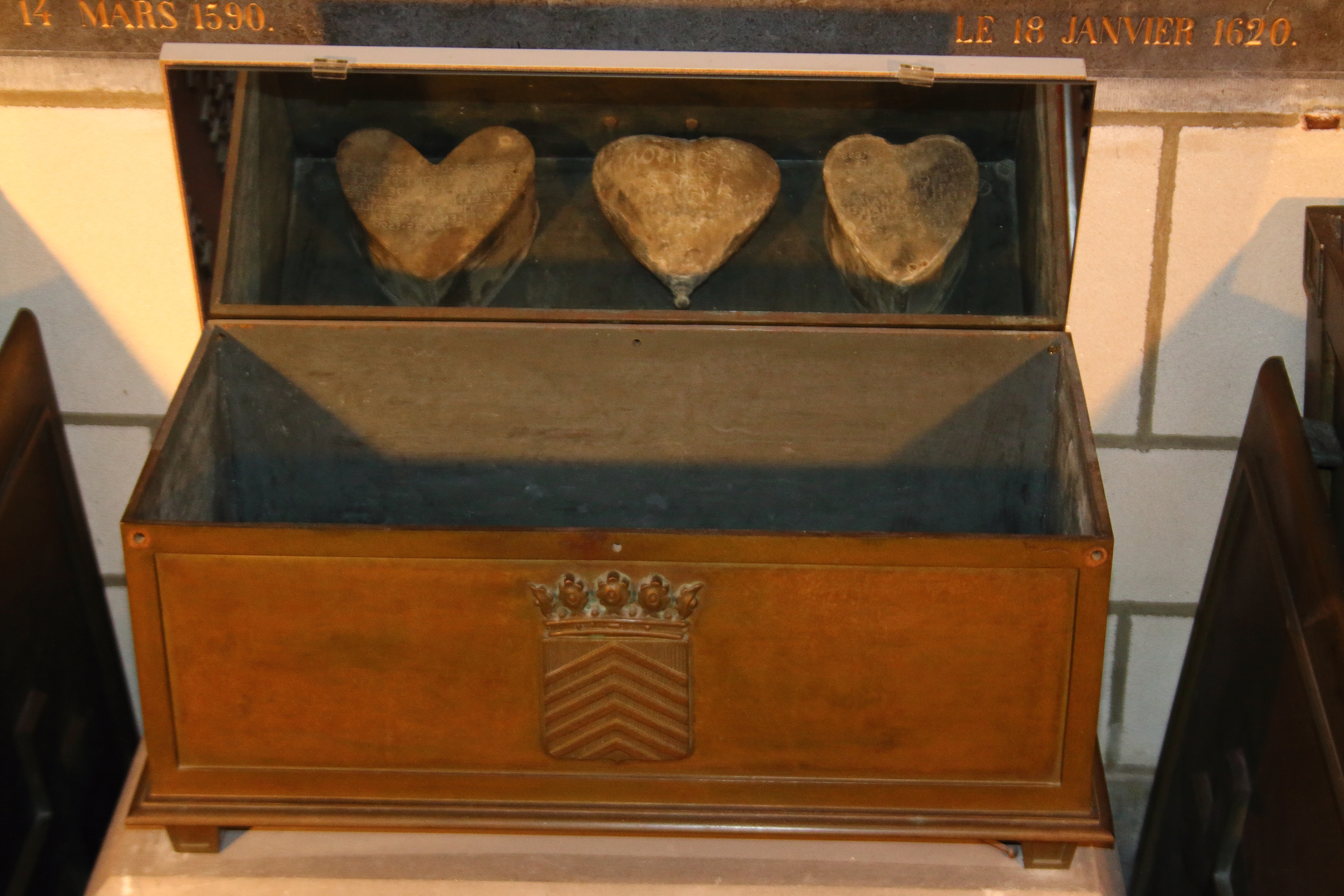
Leaden heart-shaped boxes for the hearts of Lamoral, Philip and Charles

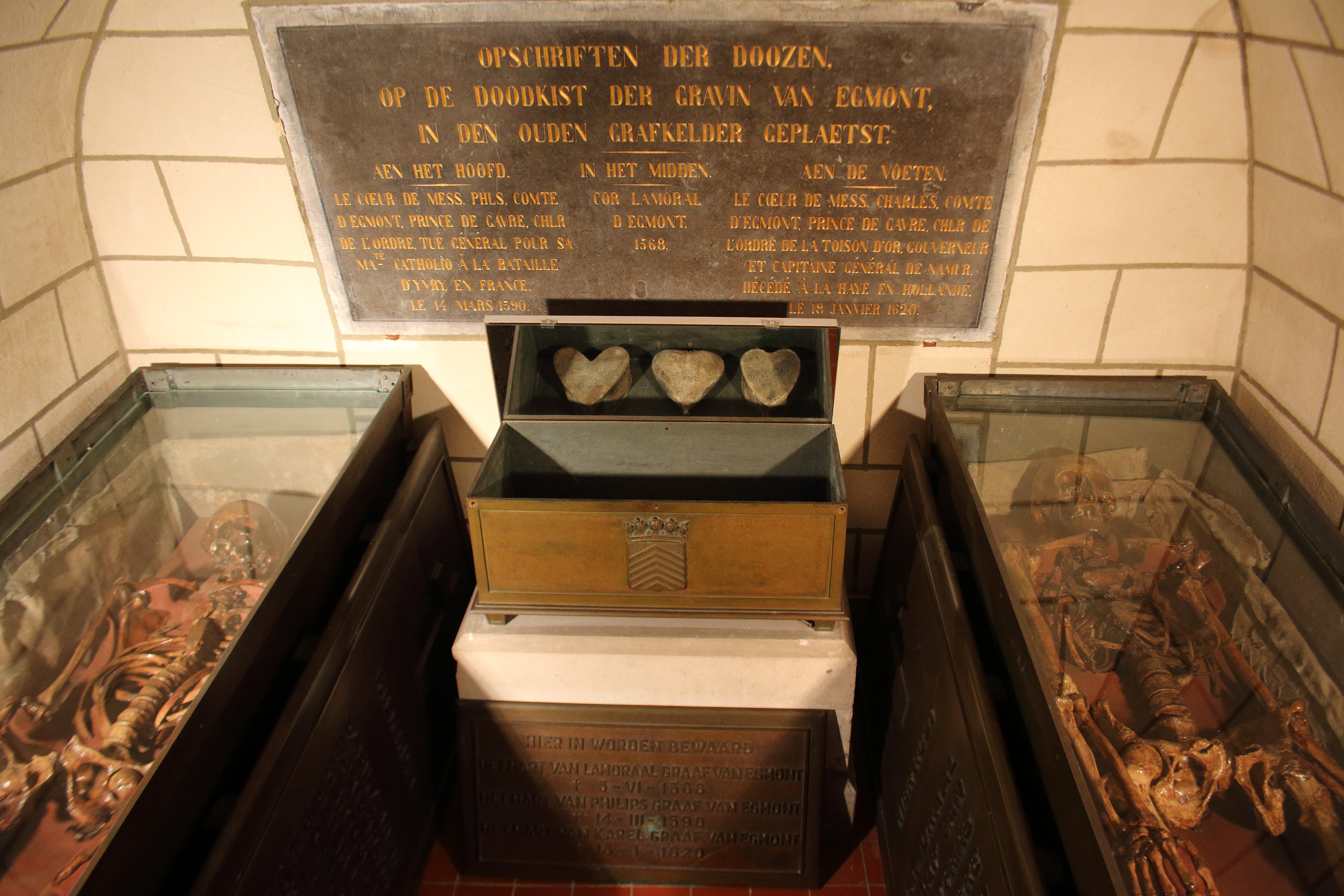
Remains of Lamoral and Sabine

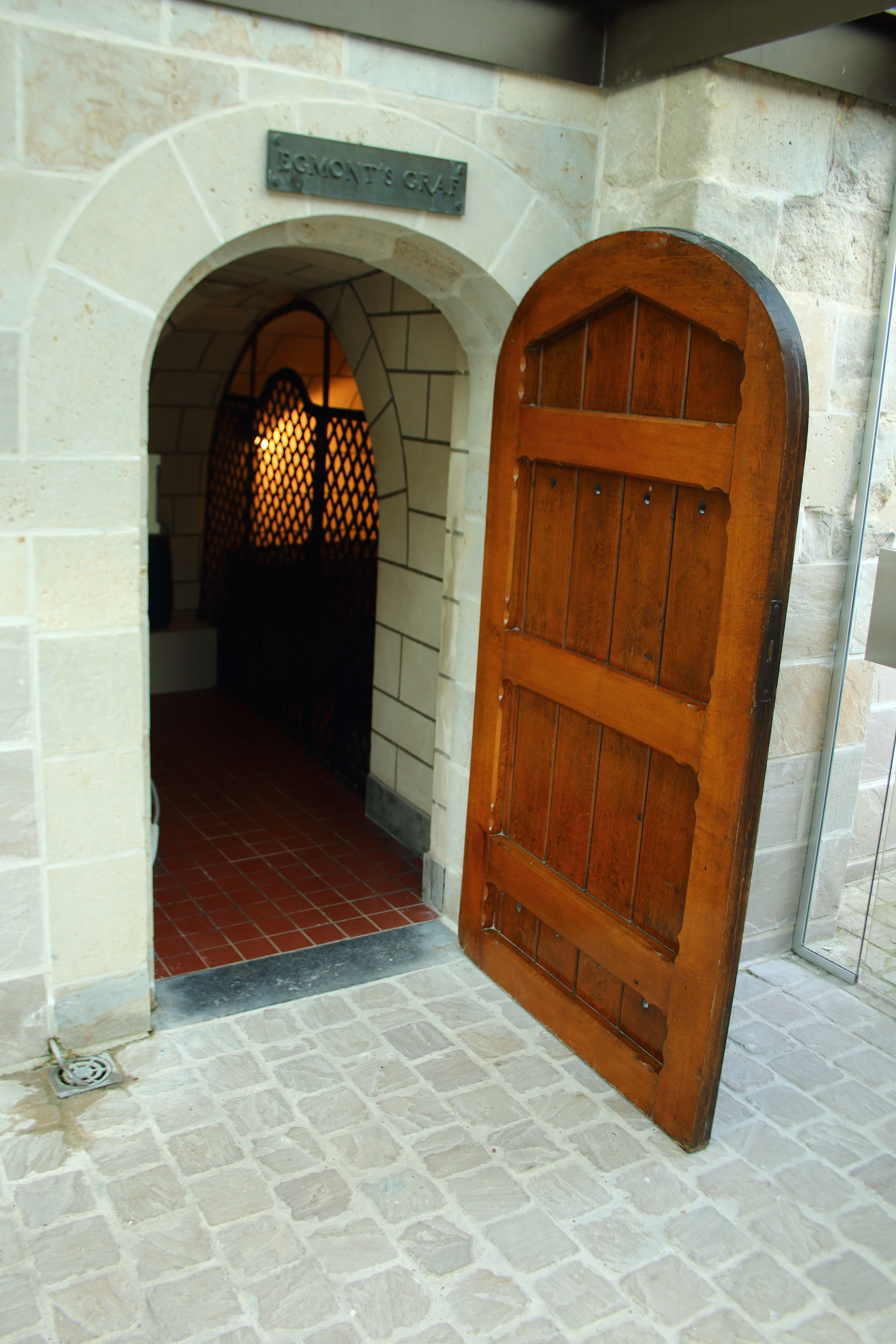
Entrance door to Egmont's crypt

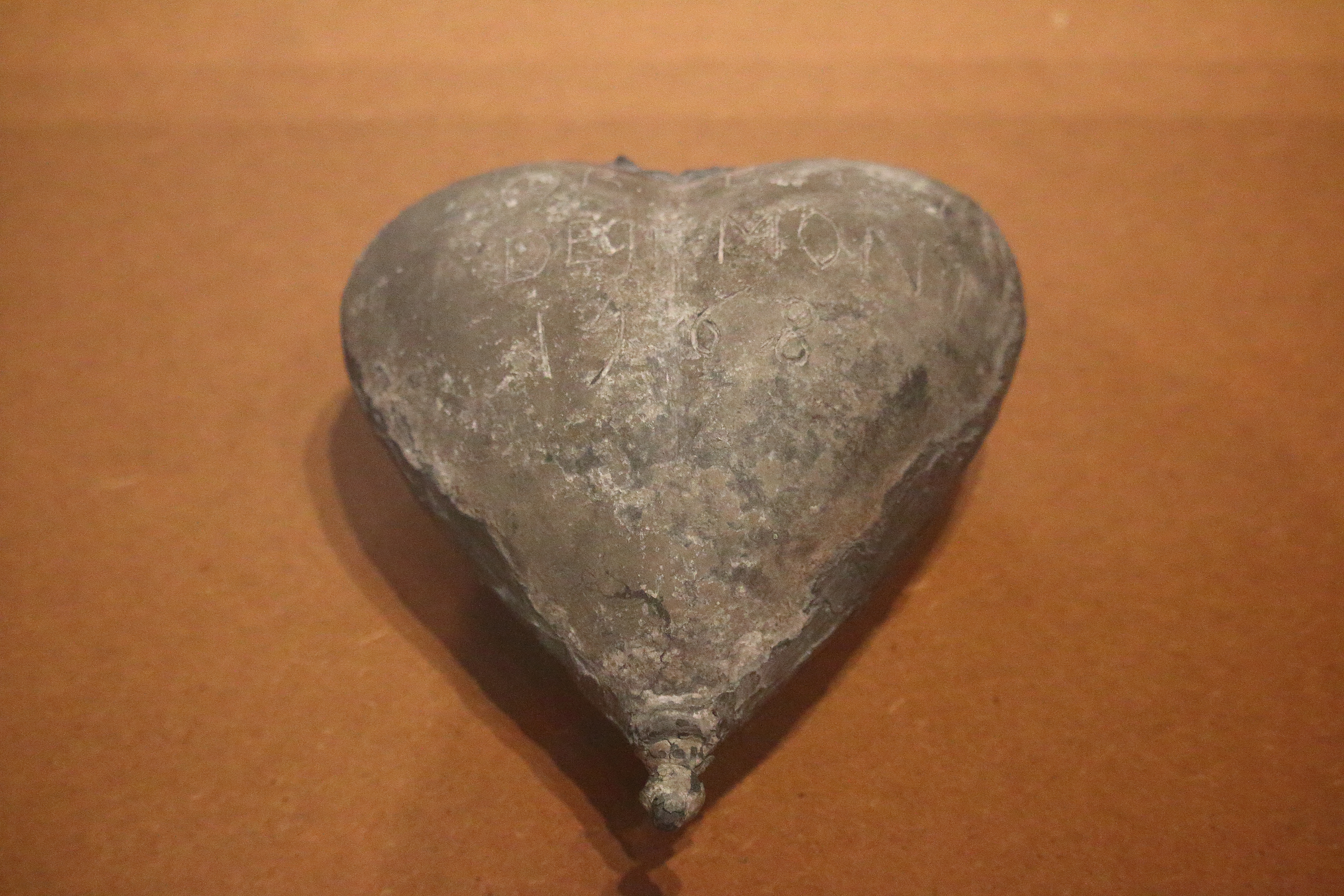
Leaden heart-shaped box for Lamoral's heart

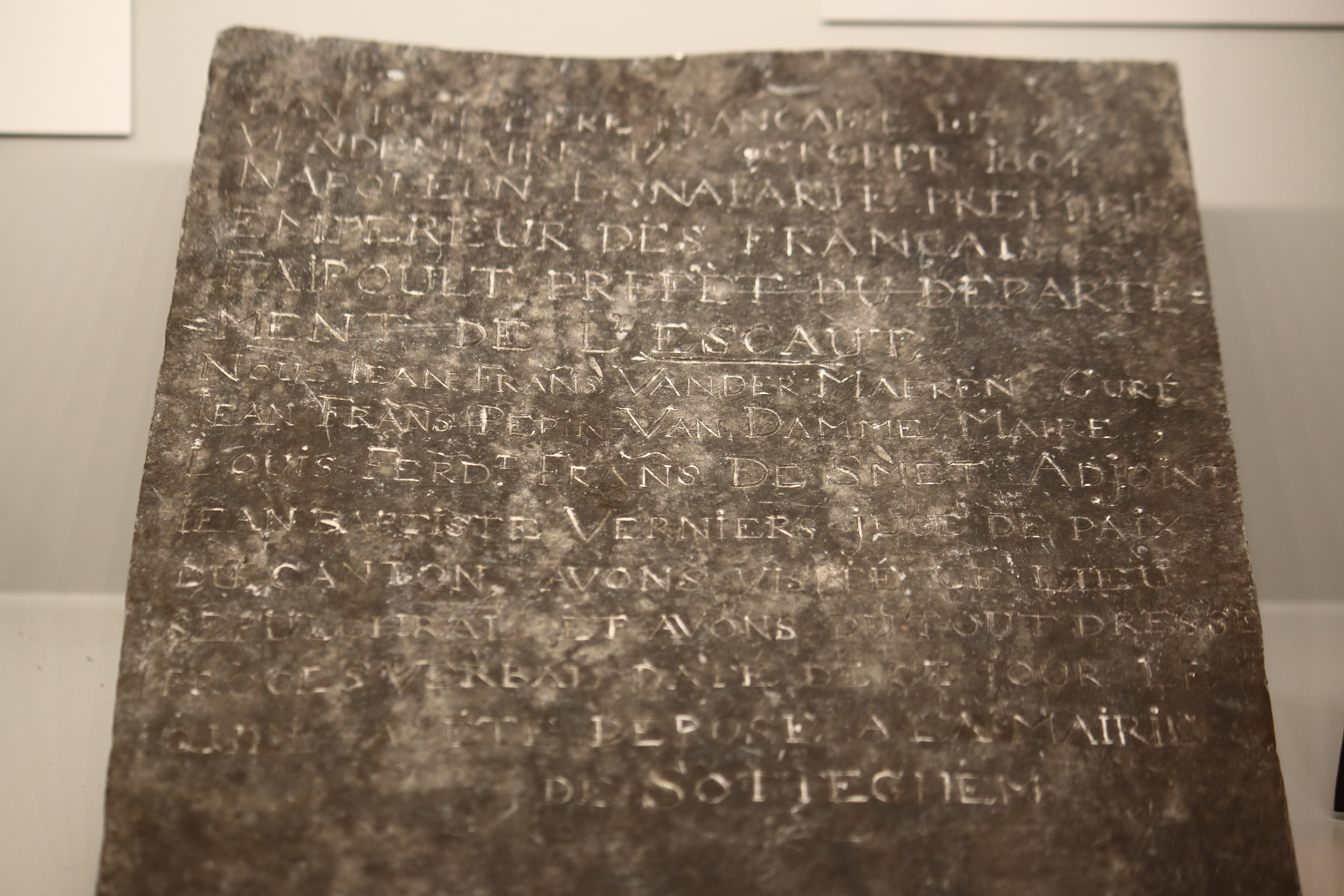
Leaden plaque (rediscovery of the crypt in 1804)

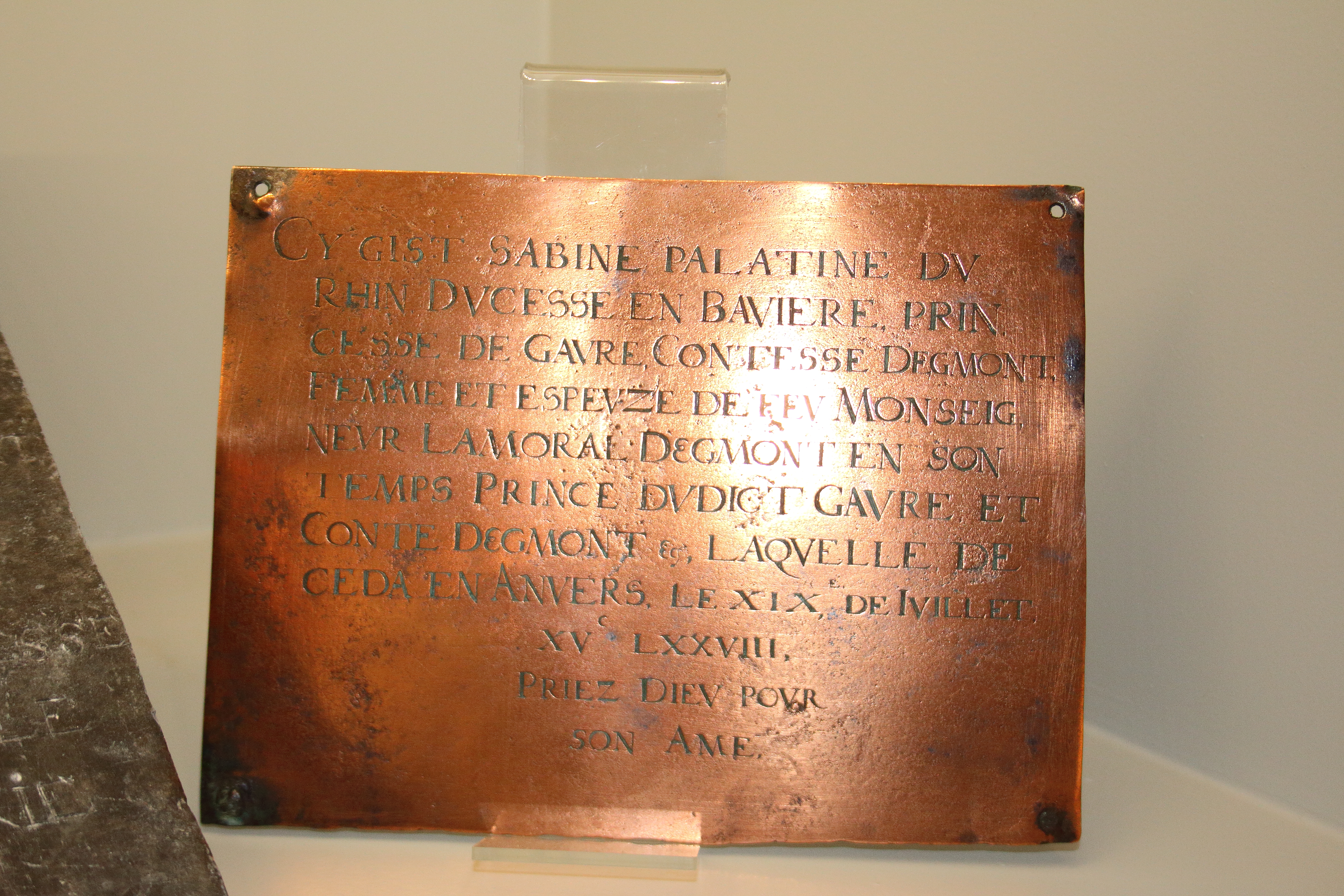
Copper burial plaque of Sabina Duchess of Bavaria (1578)

== Sources ==
- Lamarcq, D., Van crypte tot paviljoen. De gebeenten van Lamoraal tentoongesteld. In: Zottegems Genootschap voor Geschiedenis en Oudheidkunde. Handelingen XVIII (deel 2) Themanummer Graaf Lamoraal van Egmont (1522-1586), 2017, (pp. 619–636)
- Lamarcq, D., De Egmontgrafkelder. Officiële website stad Zottegem.
- De neus van Egmont. In: 80 jaar oorlog. Rijksmuseum/NTR/Atlas Contact, Amsterdam, 2018, (pp. 104–107).
- Van Rode, O., Plechtige inhuldiging van een nieuwe grafkelder voor Lamoraal, graaf van Egmont in de crypte van de Onze-Lieve-Vrouwkerk te Zottegem, oktober 1951-oktober 1954: een reconstructie aan de hand van eigentijdse getuigenissen in kranten en tijdschriften, Handelingen XIII, Zottegems Genootschap voor Geschiedenis en Oudheidkunde, 2007, pag. 37–60.
