= Sabina of Palatinate-Simmern =

Flemish Duchess

Sabina
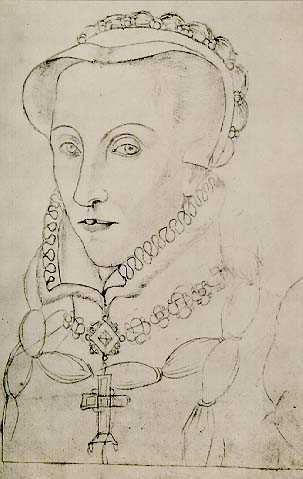
- Portrait of Duchess Sabina from the Recueil d'Arras, c. 1545
- Born: 1528
- Died: 1578 (aged 49–50)
- Burial: Egmont's crypt, Zottegem, Flanders
- Husband: Lamoral
- Father: John II
- Mother: Beatrix

Sabina of Palatinate-Simmern (Dutch: Sabina van Palts-Simmern; 1528–1578), also known as Sabina of Bavaria, was the daughter of John II, Count Palatine of Simmern and Beatrix of Baden.

== Life ==
Sabina was the eleventh of the twelve children born to her parents. Not much is known about her childhood, but she was most likely given a similar education to other noble children of her rank.

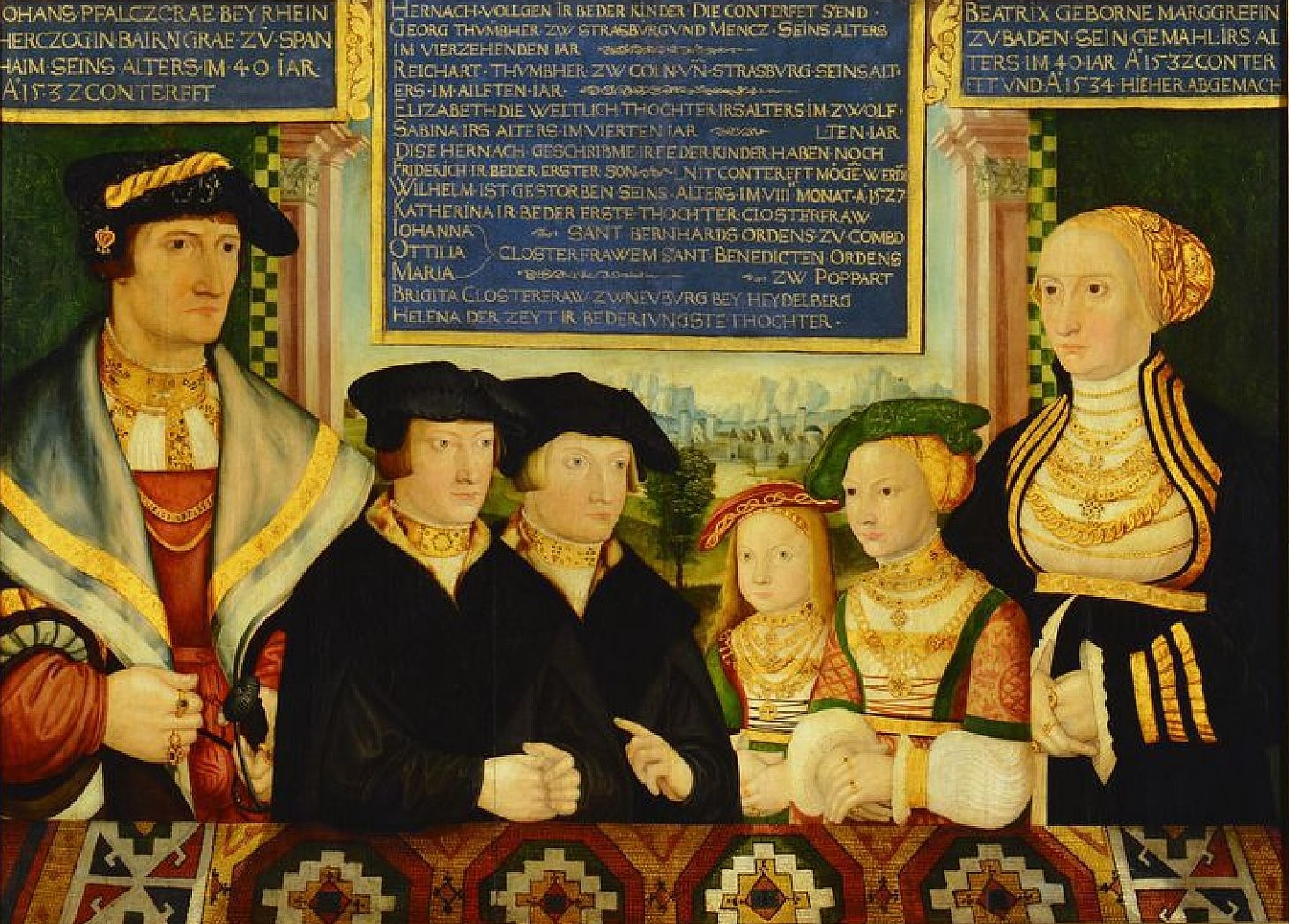
The family of Johan II von Pfalz-Simmern by an unknown artist, Neuburg an der Donau, Schloss Neuburg

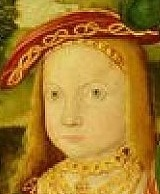

Sabina's father had received a humanist and law-based education, and was in correspondence with many prominent persons and scholars of the day. Highly regarded by Holy Roman Emperor Charles V, under whom he held several official positions (such as the emperor's representative at the imperial government in Nuremberg, and later 1536 to 1539 he was president of the Imperial Chamber Court in Speyer). As a ruler, politician and jurist, Johann II was so popular throughout the empire that he was usually simply called "Duke Hans" [German : Herzog Hans].

Sabinas mother was the daughter of Christoph of Baden-Baden and Ottilie of Katzenelnbogen. Through her grandmother Sabina could claim a relationship the Wittelsbach and Habsburg family. The epitaph on her funerary monument describes her as a person who lived an honorable way of life, and gave no room to unseemly manners."

In 1532, Sabina's mother died, and Sabina and her sister Helena was taken in to be raised at the court of her childless relative Frederick II, Elector Palatine and his wife Dorothea of Denmark in Heidelberg.

Her father remained a widower for 19 years until 1554, when he remarried to Maria Jakoba von Oettingen-Oettingen, just two years younger than Sabina.

Sabina was as a child raised in the Catholic faith of which her father was a staunch supporter and raised his children to be very pious. This coupled with the fact that the small principality of Palatine-Simmern was small and relatively poor, and therefore not able to afford the substantial dowries required to arrange marriages for all their daughters, meant that many of Sabinas older sisters went on to become nuns, apart from Sabina and her older sister Elisabeth, who married George II of Erbach and younger sister Helena who married Philip III of Hanau-Münzenberg.

== Marriage ==
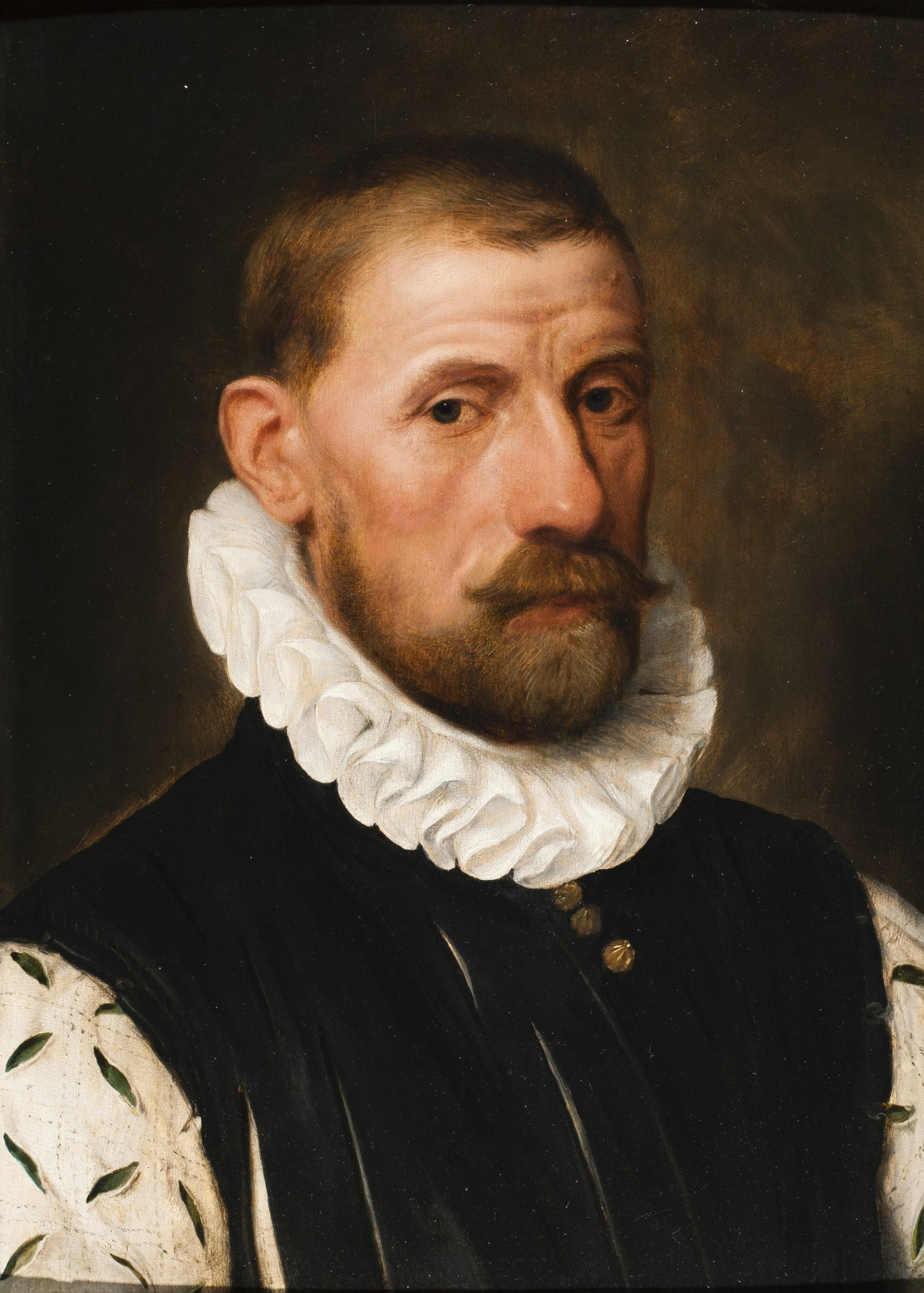
Portrait of Lamoral, Count of Egmont, Prince of Gavere (1522–1568), by Frans Pourbus the Elder

Sabina's marriage was arranged to Lamoral d'Egmont in 1543 when she was 16 years old, by Emperor Charles V. Sabina's father was only able to supply 6,000 Guilders out of the 30,000 guilders agreed upon in the marriage contract, the rest of the sum was covered by Sabina's foster parents Frederick and Dorothea.

On May 8, 1544 Sabina married Lamoral, Count of Egmont at Speyer Cathedral . The wedding was a lavish occasion spanning four days, and attended by Emperor Charles V and Ferdinand II of Inner Austria, Archduke Maximilian, German electors and other dignitaries. The couple were married by John Weze, Archbishop of Lund.

The couple would go on to have twelve children and seemed to have a good marriage. Diking out new land near the river Oude Maas, d'Egmont named these Beijerlanden after his wife. Sabina and her husband took a trip to Heidelberg in 1560, she had not seen her brother in person since her 1544 marriage. This was nominally a family visit but it also had an official component as Sabina's brother had succeeded Otto Henry as Elector Palatine and the count d'Egmont would act as Philip II's envoy to extend his congratulations on achieving the position.

=== Rivalry with Anna of Saxony ===
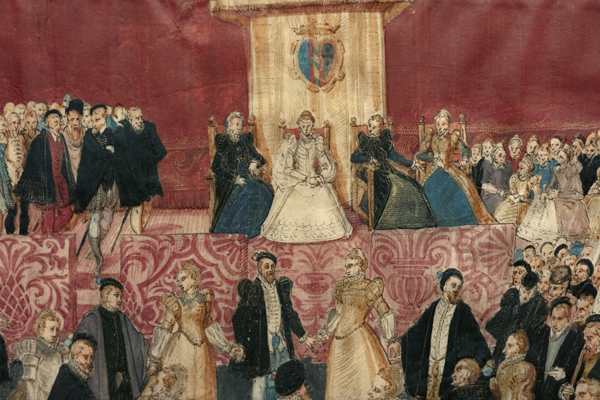
Sabina and Anna of Saxony attending the marriage of Alexander Farnese to Maria of Portugal in 1565. Circle of Frans Floris (Warsaw University Library)

Sabina had a rivalry with her husband's friend and political compatriot William I of Orange's wife, Anna of Saxony, in matter of precedence, as the wives of members of the political elite of equal prestige they were more or less equal, but it was unclear which of them had the higher rank, as Sabina carried the title of "Princess of Gavre", while Anna as the daughter of an Elector held a rank akin to a princess and was Princess of Orange by her marriage.

As a consequence there were times when both women were jostling to be the first to get through a narrow door-way and thus enter a room first and be considered the highest ranked. Eventually a compromise was reached by both ladies entering arm-in-arm at the same time.

This rivalry was played upon by other political opponents who wanted to cause a rift in the friendship and political unity between the count of Egmont and William of Orange. At one time while both women were invited to dine with the Duchess of Parma at Nassau Palace, Sabina was invited to sit down and given much attention by the duchess, while Anna was kept standing waiting for up to an hour, much to her chagrin and humiliation. Despite "the princess [Anna] dying of rage", it does not seem to have the intended effect however and was ignored by her husband.

==== Count of Egmont's politics ====
The Count of Egmont, was at the head of the faction which opposed the imposition of the Spanish Inquisition in the Netherlands by Cardinal Granvelle and ultimately forced his resignation. When Granvelle retired, d'Egmont, aided by William of Orange and Horn, continued to resist the introduction of the Inquisition and of Spanish rule in the Netherlands. Although Philip II of Spain appeared to be showing leniency in the matter, he had made up his mind to punish the opponents of his policy. He replaced the regent, the Duchess of Parma, with the Duke of Alba, who entered the Netherlands at the head of a veteran army. Orange fled from the country, but Egmont and Horn, despite his warning, decided to remain.

=== Arrest and execution of the count d´Egmont ===
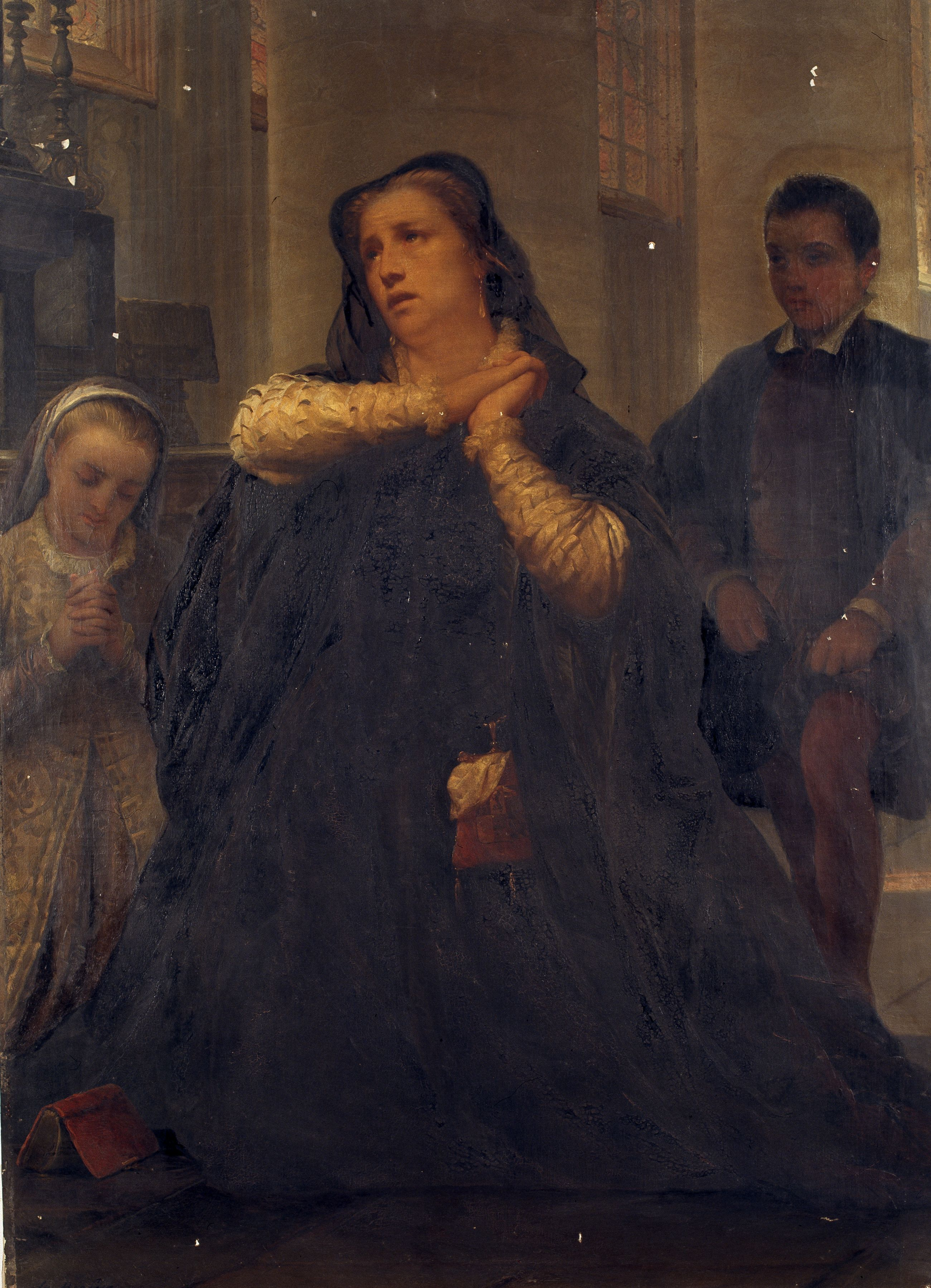
The Widow of Lamoral, Count of Egmont by Edouard De Bièfve in Museum of Fine Arts, Ghent

One day in September 1567, while the count d'Egmont and the count of Horn were attending a council of state with other knights of the order, in the very house of the Duke of Alba, a captain entered and summoned them, in the King's name, to follow him to prison. They were initially being held, under the supervision of in the house of the Count Culembourg. Kept under custody with no formal accusations lodged against them, nor any sort of a preliminary investigation, no trace of judicial review had preceded the long imprisonment of two men.

With her husband arrested, Sabina wrote a letter to Philip II, King of Spain, to plead for his release. Sabina also went to see the Duchess of Parma, half-sister of Philip II, to implore her to intervene with her brother to release the count. At which time (an eyewitness re-counted); "she was in tears, it was pitiful to see her.".

Her husband was kept in custody in Ghent awaiting his final fate, but no order for their arrest had been read to them or drawn up, but finally after a period of two months, during which Philip received many inquires from various persons into matters of the men and their fate (many of them spurred on by Sabina herself). She had also utilized her network to write to Queen Elizabeth I of England and, also sent an envoy to France and to Spain to plead for her husband with Philips wife, Elisabeth of Valois, Ruy Gómez de Silva and confessor de la Cueva (Philip refused to receive the envoy) Sabina's brother Frederick III of the Palatinate also lobbied for his release.

In the castle of Ghent, where the Counts of Egmont and Hornes had been transported, they were kept isolated and not even relatives were allowed to visit nor were they even allowed outside. Because her husband was not allowed to leave his room, and that she herself could not see him, she feared that his life was thereby in danger; Sabina then asked for his mercy or at that at least he were to be allowed to get some fresh air in the castle; she also complained about the confiscation of his goods, which was contrary to the laws and justice, before her husband had been condemned; but also added that she placed all her trust in the goodness, compassion, and justice of the king.

"I hope," she wrote in a letter on January 9, 1568, "that Your Majesty will not tolerate me leaving these provinces with my eleven children to seek a means of subsistence elsewhere, having been brought to these lands by the late, blessed memory of the Emperor your father (Charles V)."

The Duke of Alva also took note of the lengths and efforts that the countess of Egmont was willing to go to free her husband.

"Here, they consider the Countess a holy woman,and it is certain that, since the imprisonment of her husband, not a single night passes without her and her daughters,going to pray barefoot in all the religious places that exist in this city."

— Duke of Alva, Letter to Philip II

However, in a letter to the Duke of Alva, Philip noted that Emperor Maximilian II, Albert V, Duke of Bavaria and Charles III, Duke of Lorraine, the Duchess and the Dowager Duchess had written to him frequently and in the most urgent manner, in the interest of the Counts of Egmont and Horne." and added that he had given them no answer, any more than to other Knights of the Golden Fleece who had begged him to disregard the statutes of the order, and he requested Alva "to hasten the legal proceedings as much as possible".

A trial, historically known as the Council of Troubles against the two men was begun at which the count Egmonts and Horn were accused of treason and lese majeste. Despite the fact that they were members of the Order of the Golden Fleece, and claimed the privilege to be tried by their peers, Philip denied this claim, and they were tried and convicted by the Council of Troubles.

Sabina's letters and supplications did not change her husband's fate and he was sentenced to death and to on 5 June 1568 to death by beheading, which was carried out before the Town Hall on the Grand-Place, Brussels's main square.

Among the last things her husband did before his death was to write letters, to Philip II and Alva, to beg them to take good care of his family. Finally he wrote a letter to Sabina in which he enclosed a ring given to him by Philip II.

'Oh how miserable and fragile is our nature, that when we are supposed to think only of God, we are then concerned with wife and children!'

— Lamoral, count d´Egmont, Letter of Lamoral, count d´Egmont

== Children ==
Their children were ;

- Leonore(b.1545-d.1582) married Georg van Horn (Joris van Horne), count d'Hautekercke, (son of Maarten van Horne)one of the signatories of the Union of Brussels.
- Francoise (b.1549-d.)
- Segerse Cornelis (b. 1550- d. 1599)
- Magdalena (b.1552-d.) married to Floris van Stavele, count of Herlies.
- Marie-Chretienne(b.1552-d.)also known as Marie -Christine, married firstly to Edouard de Bournonville, secondly to Guillaume van Lalaing( d. 1590), count of Hoogstraten (son of Antoine de Lalaing and Eléonore de Montmorency, dame de Nivelle, a sister of Philip de Montmorency) married thirdly Karl von Mansfeld
- Philip (1558 - d.1590), 5th Count of Egmont, Order of the Golden Fleece, married to Maria van Horne, daughter of Maarten van Horne,lord of Gaasbeek och Anna de Croÿ-Chimay, no issue.
- Anna (b.1560-d.) became a nun at St Waltrude in Mons.
- Maria,(d. 1582) became a nun at La Cambre Abbey after the closure of this convent went to live in the vicinity of Brussels.
- Lamoral (1565–1617), 6th Count of Egmont, married to Marie de Pierrevive, daughter of Charles de Pierrevive, seigneur de Lesigny and Louise de Clermont. Had issue.
- Charles (1567–1620), 7th Count of Egmont, married to Marie de Lens, Lady of Aubigny, daughter of Gilles, baron d'Aubignies. Had issue.
- Isabella, died young.
- Sabina (d.1608 at Delft), married Georg, count of Solms. No issue.
- Jeanne, became a nun at La Cambre, later prioress of the St. Elizabeth convent in Brussels

=== Descendants ===
Among the descendants of Sabina and Lamoral were:

- Louis of Egmont
- Louis Philip of Egmont
- Leopold Philippe, Duke of Arenberg
- Charles Louis d'Albert, 5th Duke of Luynes

== Widowhood ==
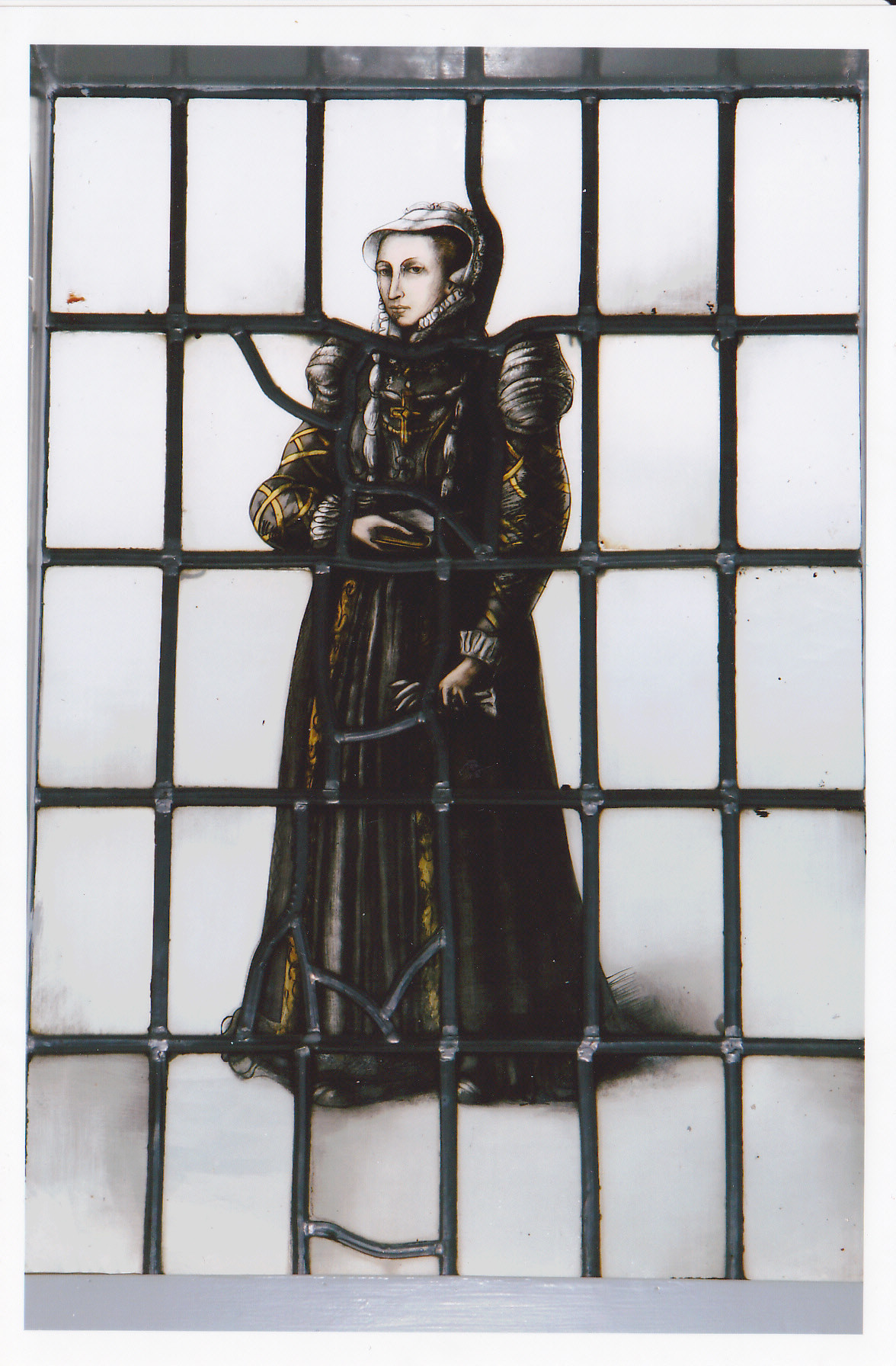
Glass window in the old town-hall in Oud-Beijerland

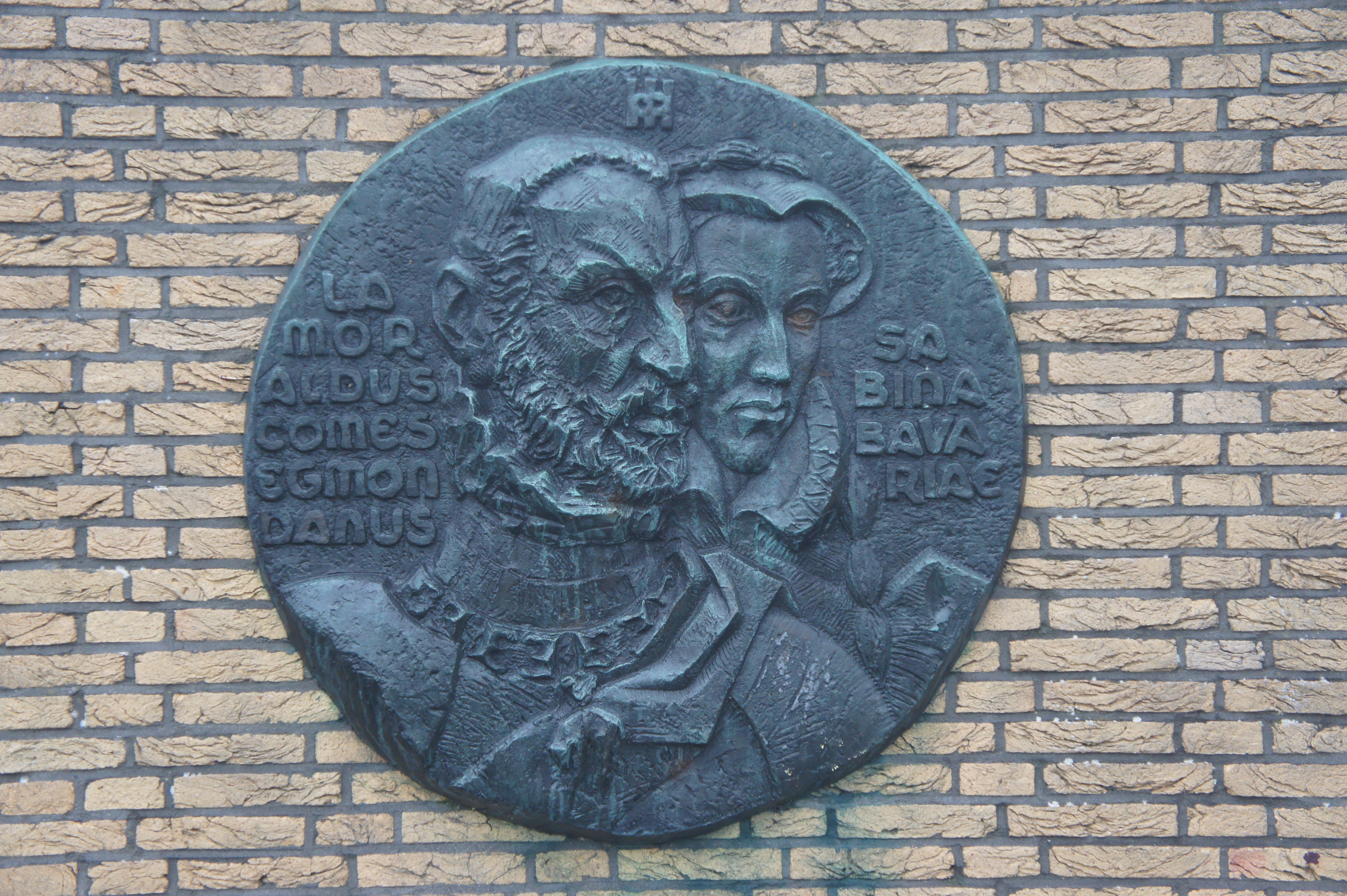
Bronze memorial plaque of Lamoral d' Egmont and Sabina of Bavaria in Oud-Beijerland by Willem Verbon(1959)

After her husband's execution Sabina displayed the d'Egmont coat of arms in front of her house, but it was removed on orders of the Duke of Alba. The body of the Count of Egmont, after being placed in the Poor Clares convent in Brussels, following his departure from St. Gudula, was transported to the church of Sotteghem, in Flanders, where he was buried on June 16.

Soon thereafter the d'Egmont Brussels residence and Gaasbeek Castle and all their inventories were put up for auction.

Now homeless and in mourning, in June 1568 the countess and her children found refuge at La Cambre Abbey. From there she wrote letters to Philip II and to the Duke of Alba asking to remain in Philip's good graces and asking for the inheritance she and her children were due as legitimate heirs of the count of Egmont. As part of her widows jointure drawn up at the time of her marriage, she was also to receive Egmont castle, as well as the rents attached to the land of 6,000 florins.

Furthermore, apart from this inheritance her husband had substantial estates as the count of Egmont, prince de Gavre and van Steenhuysen, baron de Fiennes, Gaesbeke and La Hamaide, seigneur de Purmerent, Hoogwoude, Aertswoude, Beyerland, Sottenghien, Dondes, Auxy and Baer. Some of these lands were eventually returned to his heirs by the Bishop in 1600. Later Sabina received an annual allowance from Philip II of about 10,000 Crowns.

The position of the family improved somewhat in 1576, when all the Dutch provinces signed the Pacification of Ghent. In it, a decision was made to evict Spanish forces and get control back in the hands of the Dutch themselves, and a general amnesty was issued for acts on both sides after the troubles started in 1568. For the Egmont family, this was good news, because they got some of their possessions back. Further positive developments followed when her niece, the daughter of the count of Egmont's sister, Louise of Lorraine, became the wife and queen of Henry III of France in 1575. With the backing of the French king the estates were restored to the family in 1576.

Armentières was one such property which was later returned to Sabina's children. A Te Deum was sung at the church in Armentières to give thanks to God that he had wanted the Countess d'Egmont and her children to be returned to possession of their father's property.

Sabina later lived for a time in Liège, before being offered to live at Waterloo castle by Jan IV de Merode, Lord of Westerloo She also acted as a guardian of her two oldest sons and administedered their lands, she also set about to settling her children; the sons in the military and her daughters in marriages.

== Death ==
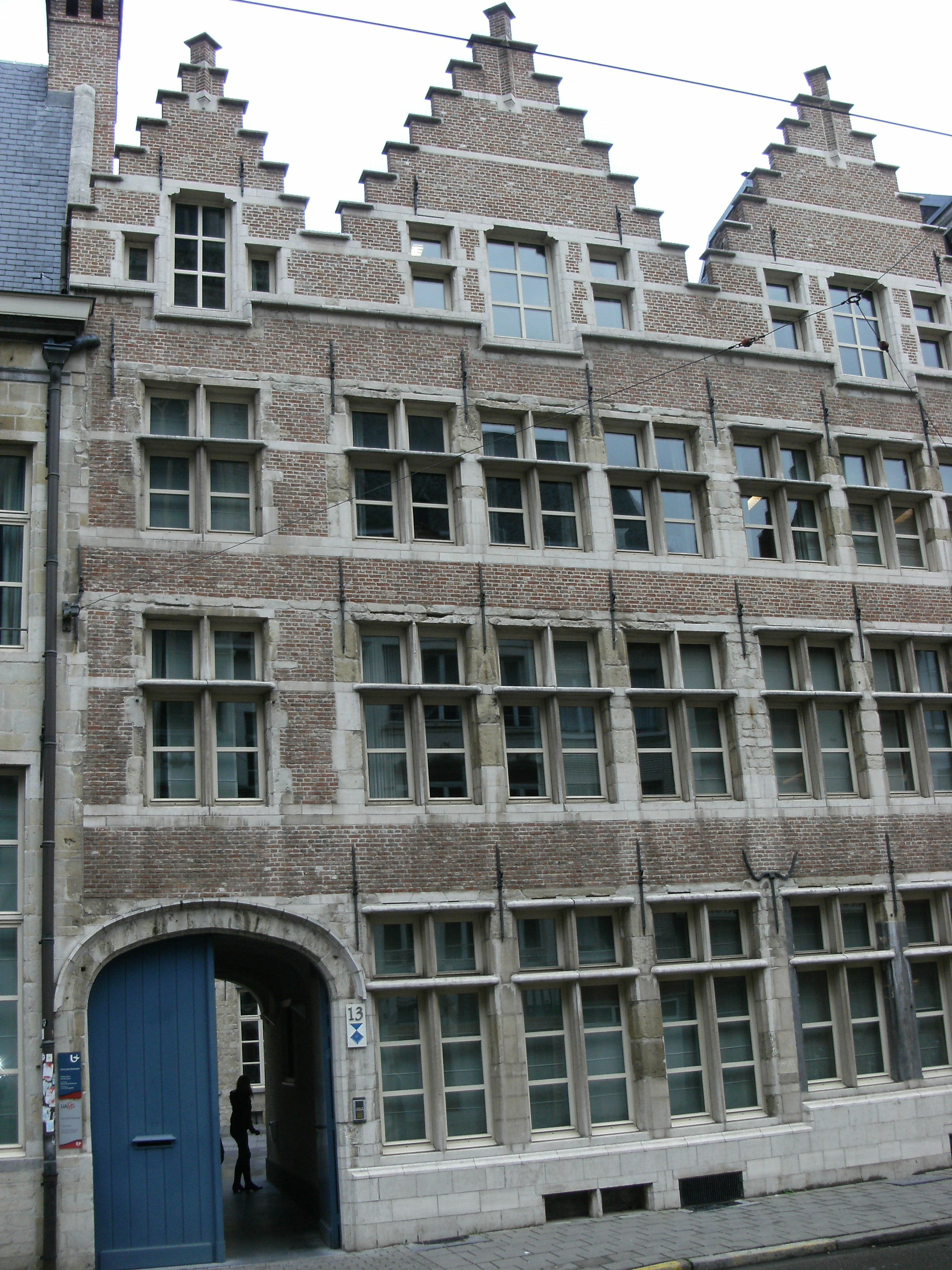
The house called ""Het Brantijser"" near Sint-Jacobsmarkt, Antwerpen where Sabina, countess d´Egmont died.

Sabine died on June 19, 1578 in Antwerp, in the house of the Pierre van Dale and Melchior van Groenenberghe. She was buried next to her husband in Egmont's crypt at the Church of the Assumption of Our Lady in Zottegem. Sabina's sons becames wards of the States General, with their guardians being François de la Kéthulle, seigneur de Ryhove and Daniël Borchgrave, attorney general of Flanders.
