= St. Catherine's Church, Hoogstraten =

Church in Hoogstraten, Belgium

St. Catherine's Church
- Sint-Katharinakerk
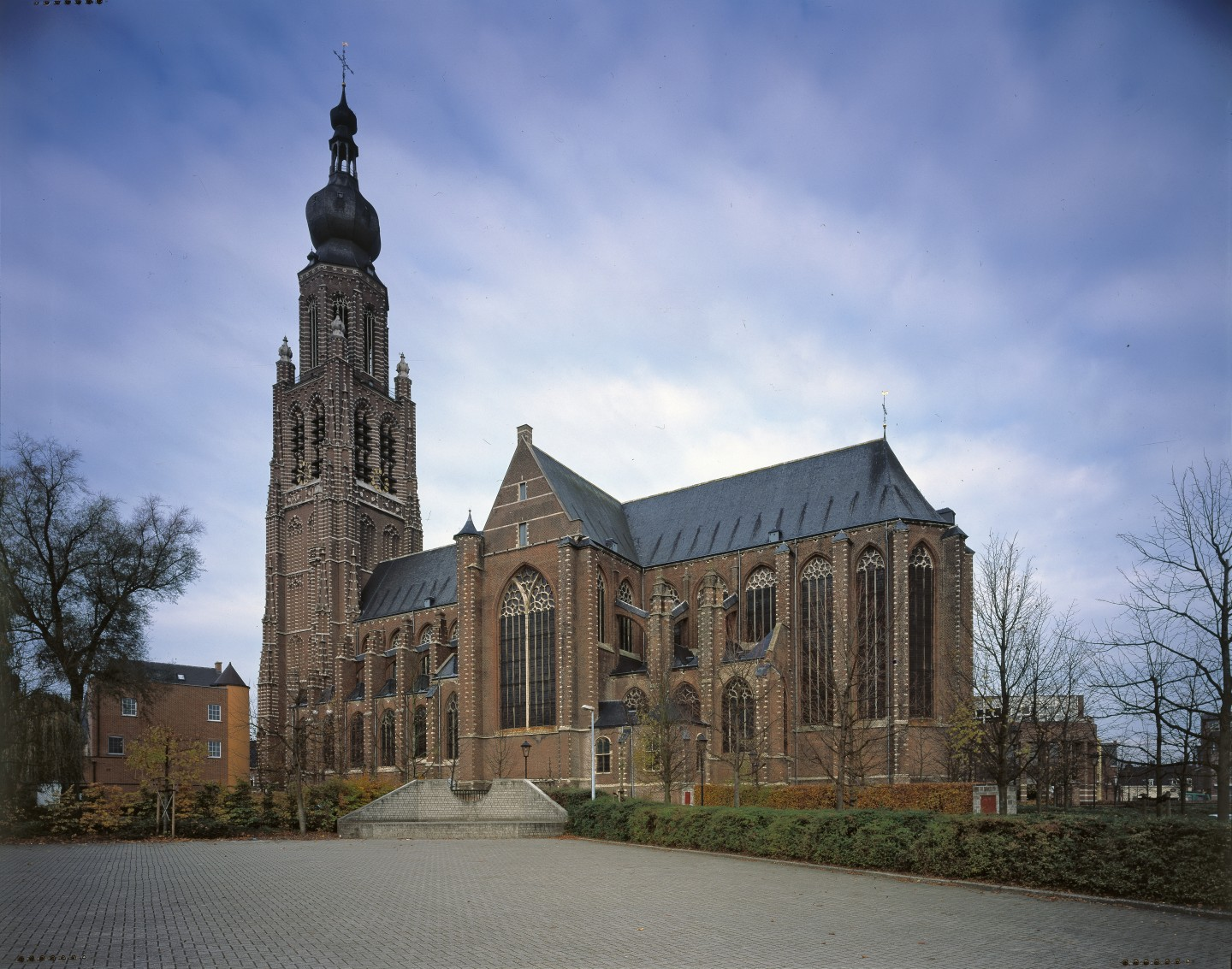
- St. Catherine's Church, Hoogstraten
- St. Catherine's Church
- 51.401°N 4.762°E
- Location: Hoogstraten
- Country: Belgium
- Denomination: Roman Catholic
- Website: https://sintkatharinakerk.be/

History
- Dedication: Catherine of Alexandria
- Dedicated: unknown
- Other dedication: Holy Trinity
- Consecrated: October 5, 1544

Architecture
- Heritage designation: Protected monument
- Designated: 1936
- Architect: Rombout II Keldermans
- Architectural type: brick Gothic
- Style: late Gothic
- Years built: 1525-1550

Specifications
- Capacity: 500
- Materials: red brick, white sandstone

Administration
- Archdiocese: Archdiocese of Mechelen–Brussels
- Diocese: Diocese of Antwerp

Clergy
- Priest: Bart Rombouts

St. Catherine's Church in Hoogstraten, Belgium, was built between 1525 and 1550 by order of Antoon van Lalaing and Elisabeth van Culemborg, Count and Countess of the County of Hoogstraten. The imposing building is also referred to as "Cathedral of the Kempen" or popularly as "our Katrien".

The church is built in late Gothic style, more specifically a mixture of Kempen Gothic and Brabantine Gothic, based on plans by architect Rombout II Keldermans (died in 1531). The tower has a square base and is 104.7 meters high, corresponding to approximately 150 Brabant cubits. The base of the bell tower is quadrangular and merges into an octagonal (8 is the number of infinity) candle with flame, a double pear spire covered with slates. The design incorporates white layers of sandstone.

The church is the third tallest church building in Belgium. Characteristic is the red Kempen brick, which while typical of the region, is rarely used for towers of that size. Although it is not the highest brick church in Belgium, it is the church where the brick is the highest.

The church did not suffer in the religious riots of the 16th century, but on October 23, 1944, the tower was dynamited by the retreating German troops just before the liberation. Reconstruction followed from 1952 to 1958.

The church has been a protected monument since 1936.

== History ==
St. Catherine's Church was built on the site of an older Romanesque church. This church was rebuilt in Gothic style in the 13th and 14th centuries, and again after a fire in 1442. It was eventually completely demolished before construction of the current church began.

Construction started on November 18, 1525. Antoon van Lalaing and Elisabeth van Culemborg, Count and Countess of the County of Hoogstraten, commissioned the construction of the church. It was built to a design by Rombout II Keldermans. His nephew Anthonis III Keldermans was given responsibility for the masonry of the tower. The site manager was Hendrik Lambrechts. The initial plans were to build a five-aisled church with continuous side chapels in the outer naves, following the example of the church in Bourg-en-Bresse. However, these plans were revised and reduced to a cheaper three-aisled church. The works probably came to a standstill between 1534 and 1535 for budgetary reasons. Despite the choice of a local brick as building material, the difficult supply of white bricks repeatedly caused construction delays. The church was consecrated on October 5, 1544. The tower was completely finished in 1546. Over time, care was taken to ensure that the monument did not undergo any changes in architecture or style. At that time, the town hall, the Gelmelslot and the Clarissen monastery were built by the same clients.

At the end of the Second World War (October 23, 1944) the tower was blown up by the German army. The Germans feared that the tower could serve as a lookout for the Allies. The falling tower destroyed the nave and the town hall next to the church. Only the choir, part of the transept, the columns and the arches of the central nave remained standing. All glassware present was destroyed. However, most of the stained glass windows had been stored in the crypt of Prince Niklaas-Leopold of Salm-Salm since 1941 and were replaced in 1952. On March 29, 1945, the church was hit a second time by a V1 bomb, which damaged the high choir.

The tower and the church were rebuilt according to the original plan under the direction of the architects Jozef-Louis Stynen and Pol Berger. However, a concrete roof truss was chosen. On June 1, 1958, the last phase of the works was completed.

Since 2000, falling stones from the church tower have been increasingly reported. Climbers were regularly deployed to clear the tower of loose stones. At the end of June 2009, it was discovered that the tower had begun to tilt away from the nave. This is clearly visible both inside and outside through cracks in the wall. Pieces of brick and sandstone also regularly fell down, forcing people to set up a net. According to some, the slanting is due to the inferior quality of the material used to rebuild the church after World War II. Concrete rot was also found and the slates on the onion dome needed to be replaced.
