= County of Culemborg =

Polity in the Holy Roman Empire

Coordinates: 51°55′N 5°11′E

County of Culemborg Heerlijkheid Culemborg Graafschap Culemborg
- 1318–1798
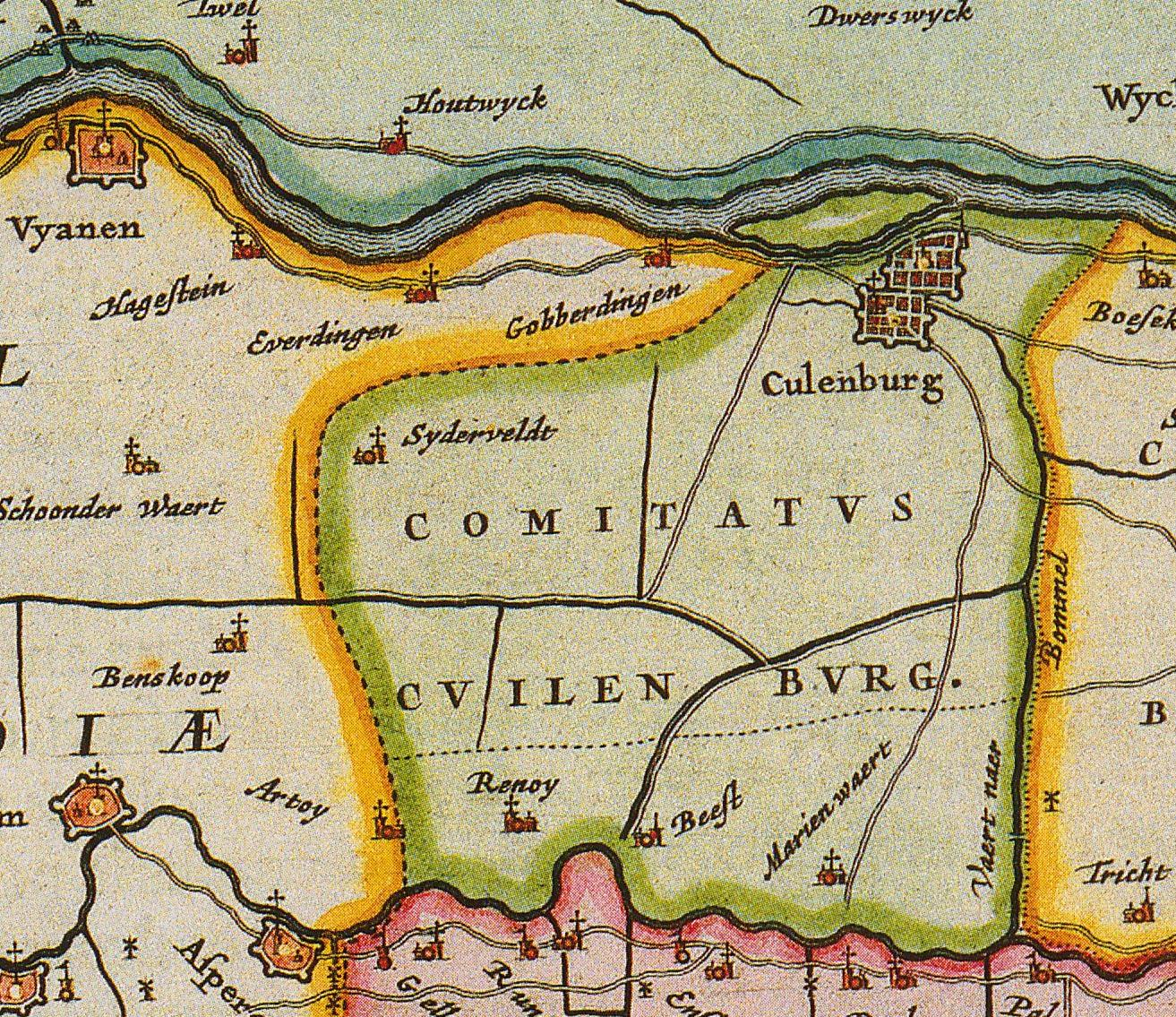
- Culemborg in 1665
- Status: Territory within the Holy Roman Empire (1318–1548); Territory in the Burgundian Circle (1548–1648); Vassal state of the Dutch Republic (1588-1720); Located in the Nijmegen Quarter (1720-1795)
- Capital: Culemborg
- History
  - Established: 1318
  - Disestablished: 1798
Succeeded by
Batavian Republic

The Lordship of Culemborg (alternatively Kuilenburg and Cuylenburg), elevated to a county in 1555, in the current province of Gelderland, was an independent polity that until 1720 was in principle not part of the Dutch Republic, but in practice was largely dependent on it. It consisted of the city of Culemborg and the villages of Everdingen, Goilberdingen and Zijderveld.

== History ==
In 1318, Culemborg received city rights from the lord, Jan van Beusichem. From 1341, the lords of Culemborg also owned the domain of Werth (Weert) near Borken. The coat of arms of this domain (black lion in silver) was included in the coat of arms of the domain of Culemborg (three red columns in gold).

Shortly before the death of the last lady of Culemborg, Elisabeth van Culemborg (who died on December 9, 1555, and was married to Antoine of Lalaing), Emperor Charles V elevated the seigneury to a county. Floris of Pallandt (1539-1598), a grandson of her eldest sister, inherited the county. Floris was also ruler in the county of Wittem and played an important role in the Dutch revolt against royal authority. In 1639 the county came to Count Philip Theodoor van Waldeck-Eisenberg through his mother Anna van Baden-Durlach. The last Count of Waldeck-Eisenberg, George Frederik (who died in 1692) left the county to his daughter Louisa Anna. Following her death without issue in 1714, the county passed to the son of her deceased sister Sophia Henriette, who had been married to Ernst of Saxe-Hildburghausen. In 1709 the manor of Werth was sold to the Prince-Bishopric of Münster.

Duke Ernst Frederik sold the county in 1720 to the Landstände of the Nijmegen Quarter, who in turn donated it to Stadtholder William IV in 1748. The House of Orange still carries the title of Count of Culemborg.

== Protestant reformation ==
In the sixteenth century the Anabaptists were active in Culemborg, which the Diet fiercely opposed in 1539. In 1534/1535, a resident of Culemborg, Wolter Tesschenmacher, acted at the fall of the Anabaptist kingdom in Munster. In 1566, sympathizers of the iconoclasts manifested themselves with the active cooperation of the Count of Culemborg Floris van Pallandt. In the same year, Floris handed over the chapel of the Sint-Pietersgasthuis to the Calvinists, which became the first Protestant church building in the Netherlands.

In the 1570s, the Johan Willemsvolk gang from Wesel in particular was active in Culemborg. The People of Johan Willemsz was the largest splinter group of the Batenburg sect that combined political criticism with criminality in its actions. People lived by robbery and murder in the countryside in the border region of Holland and Germany.

The free tolerance policy during the reformation had hardly worked in Gelre, in contrast to Holland. The free domain of Culemborg was an exception to this.

With the arrival of the German Van Waldeck-Eisenberg family as counts of Culemborg, Lutheranism entered Culemborg. In 1640, a preacher came from Germany to conduct services for the count's family and staff in the castle's court chapel.

== Lords and Counts of Culemborg ==
Reign	Name	Birth	Death	Family
1271-1309	Hubert III van Bosinchem/Hubert I van Culemborg		1309	Originating from the Van Bosinchem family
1296-1322	Jan I van Bosinchem		1322	Son
1322-1347	Hubert IV van Bosinchem/Hubert II van Culemborg		1347	Son
1347-1394	Gerard I		28-5-1394	Brother
1394-1422	Hubert III		circa 1439	Son
1422-1452	Jan II		1-4-1452	Brother
1452-1480	Gerard II		9-3-1480	Brother
1480-1506	Jasper	ca. 1456	21-11-1506	Son
1506-1555	Elizabeth	1475	9-12-1555	Daughter
1555-1598	Floris I van Pallandt	1537	29-9-1598	Nephew
1598-1639	Floris II van Pallandt	28-5-1578	4-6-1639	Son
1639-1645	Philip Dietrich, Count of Waldeck	2-11-1614	7-12-1645	Great-grandson of Floris I
1645-1664	Henry Wolrad, Count of Waldeck	28-3-1642	15-7-1664	Son
1664-1692	Prince Georg Friedrich of Waldeck	31-1-1620	19-11-1692	Paternal uncle
1692-1714	Louise Anna van Waldeck-Eisenberg	18-4-1653	30-6-1714	Daughter
1714-1720	Ernest Frederick I, Duke of Saxe-Hildburghausen	21-8-1681	9-3-1724	Nephew (sister's son)
1720-1748	Landstände of the Nijmegen Quarter			Sold
1748-1766	William IV	1-9-1711	22-10-1751	Donation
1766-1795	William V	8-3-1748	9-4-1806	Son

With the arrival of the Batavian Republic, the counties ceased to exist. However, due to the donation to William IV, the head of the House of Orange-Nassau (the Dutch head of state) continues to use the title Count/Countess of Culemborg to this day.
