= Hoogstraten Castle =

Castle in Hoogstraten, Belgium

Coordinates: 51.4022°N 4.7808°E

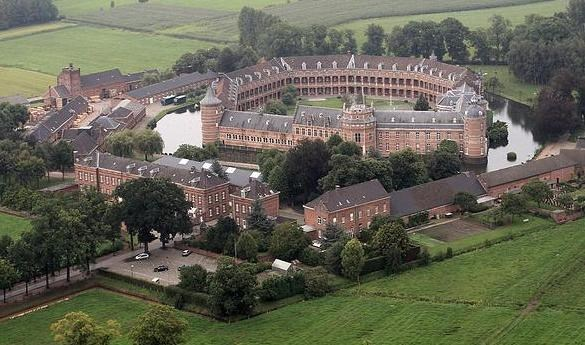
Aerial view of Hoogstraten castle (2016)

The Gelmel Castle or Hoogstraten Castle (Dutch: Kasteel van Hoogstraten or Dutch: Gelmelslot) is a moated castle in Hoogstraten, Belgium. Legend links its origins to a wooden tower raised by the Viking Gelmel in the 9th century, but the first stone fortifications date from the late 12th century. Jan IV van Cuijk rebuilt it as a Gothic stronghold in the early 15th century. Elisabeth of Culemborg and her husband Antoine of Lalaing turned it into a princely Renaissance-style residence between 1525 and 1555. Although fires, sieges and French confiscation destroyed much of its fabric, key Renaissance elements—most visibly the massive gatehouse and corner towers—still stand. Used since 1810 for social and penal institutions and now housing a penitentiary school centre, the castle remains state property.

== History ==
=== Middle Ages ===
Possibly dating back to the 9th century, the castle began life as a timber residential tower ringed by a moat fed by the River Mark. Legend credits its foundation to Gelmel, a Viking leader. In later centuries it became a forward bastion of the Margraviate of Antwerp. The tower was probably rebuilt in stone at the end of the 12th century, and in the first half of the 15th century Jan IV van Cuijk (1360–1442) transformed it into a Gothic stronghold protected by two concentric walls and moats. Through inheritance, the castle passed to the Van Culemborg family.

=== A Renaissance makeover: The Culemborg and Lalaing families ===
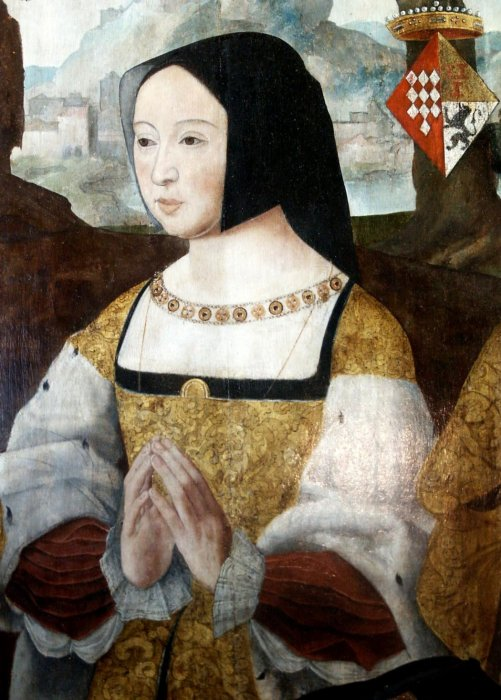
Elisabeth of Culemborg

The last lady of Culemborg who owned the castle was Elisabeth of Culemborg (1475 – 1555), who was also a dame d'honneur of Archduchess Margaret of Austria. She spent most of her life at the court of the Netherlands, where she was an important and leading figure. In 1509, she married Antoine of Lalaing (1480–1540), a nobleman who held various high offices in the Habsburg Netherlands. In 1518, Emperor Charles V promoted Antoine to 1st Count of Hoogstraten.

Between 1525 and 1540, Elisabeth and Antoine transformed the castle into transformed into a magnificent and luxurious princely residence with the help of architect Rombout II Keldermans . The complex was a show‑piece renaissance-style palace: three rings of fortifications with watch‑towers and drawbridges, an armoury, two chapels, colonnades, richly decorated halls and galleries, extensive gardens and fountains. Next to the castles in Hoogstraten and Culemburg, the couple had luxurious city-palaces in Antwerpen, Brussels, and Mechelen – the main cities of the Netherlands.

After the deaths of Antoine and Elisabeth, the castle and lands of Hoogstraten passed to the Philip van Lalaing, the second Count of Hoogstraten. The County of Culemborg passed to the Van Pallandt family.

The castle withstood Maarten van Rossum’s siege of 1542, yet its fortunes changed dramatically during the early phases of the Dutch Revolt. Its owner at the time, Antoine II van Lalaing (1533–1568), the third Count of Hoogstraten, allied himself with Prince William of Orange. In April 1566, at the summons of the prince of Orange, Dutch high noblemen met at the castle in Hoogstraten where they discussed the political situation in the Netherlands resulting in the Smeekschrift der Edelen (English: the Petition of Nobles). In this document, signatories urged King Philip II of Spain to halt the Inquisition and grant wider religious freedom in the Netherlands —an appeal that helped set the Eighty Years’ War in motion. Two years later the crown confiscated the count’s estates; part of the castle library was shipped to the royal collections in the Escorial.

Hoogstraten castle was returned to the Lalaing family under the Pacification of Ghent in 1576, but calamity soon struck again. Fire in 1581 and a siege during the Mutiny of Hoogstraten in 1603, left it badly scarred; partial repairs followed in 1615, but when the great powers declared the area neutral in 1618 the outer defences had to be razed. Although restoration plans were drafted in the 17th century, they were never carried out due to lack of funds. The inner castle remained in ruins.

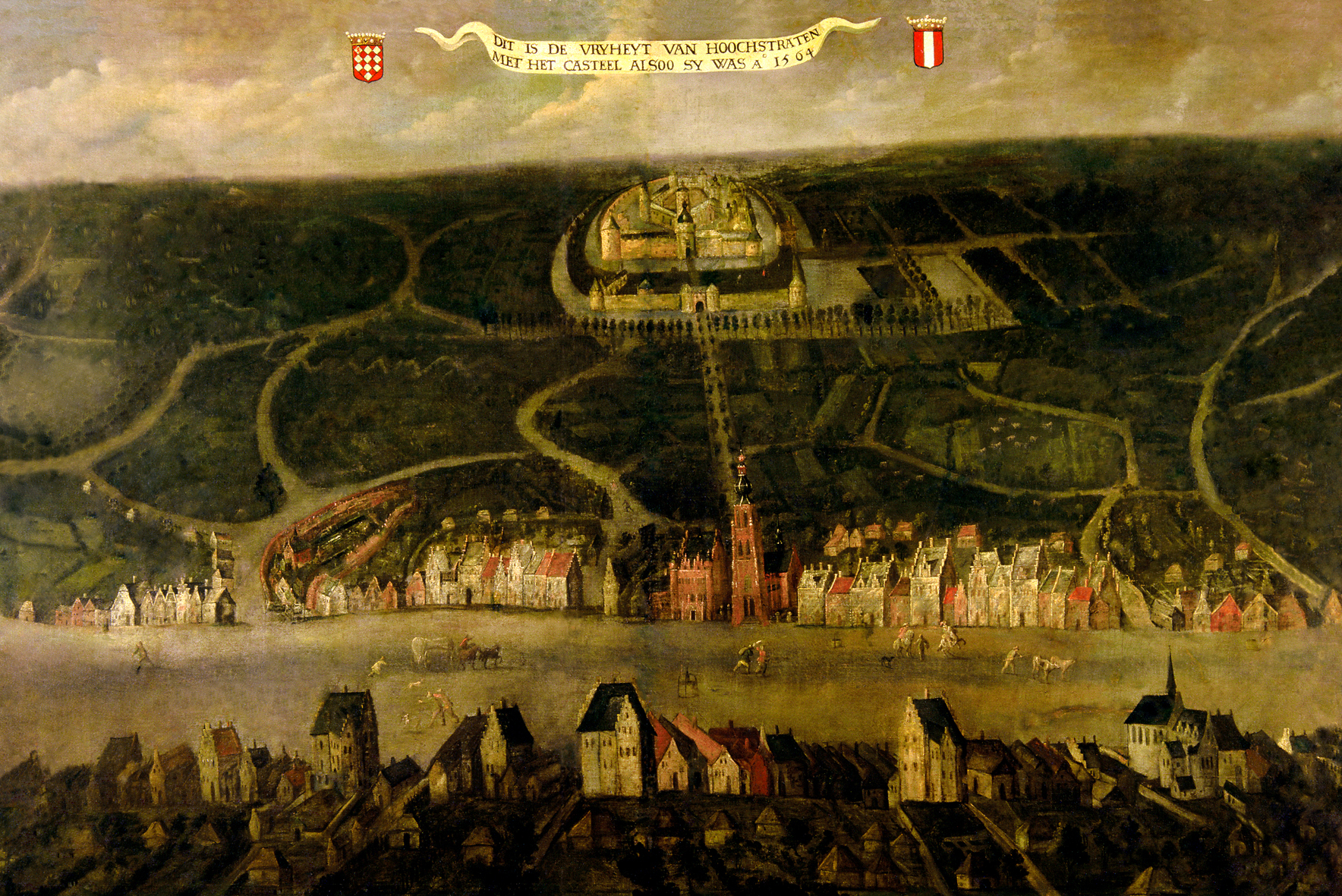
The city of Hoogstraten with the castle in the back (1564)

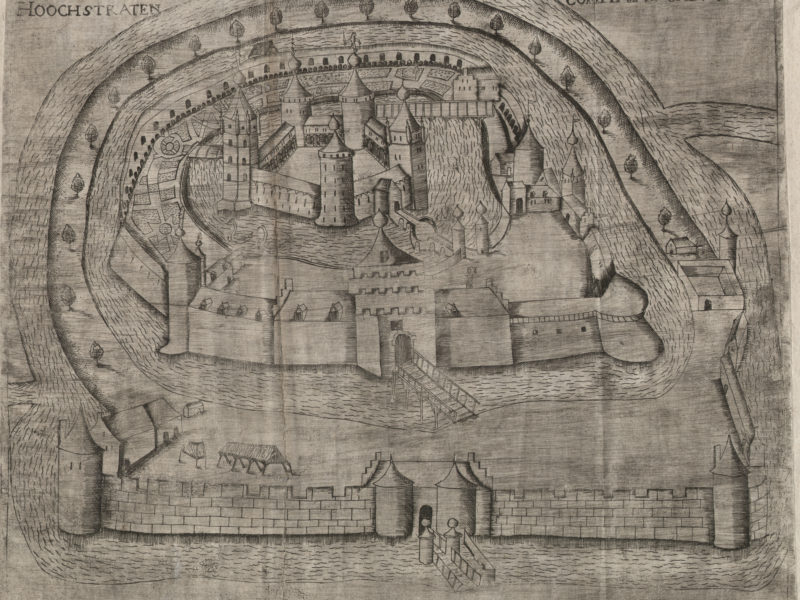
Hoogstraten castle in the 16th century: at the core of the complex was the pentagonal inner castle

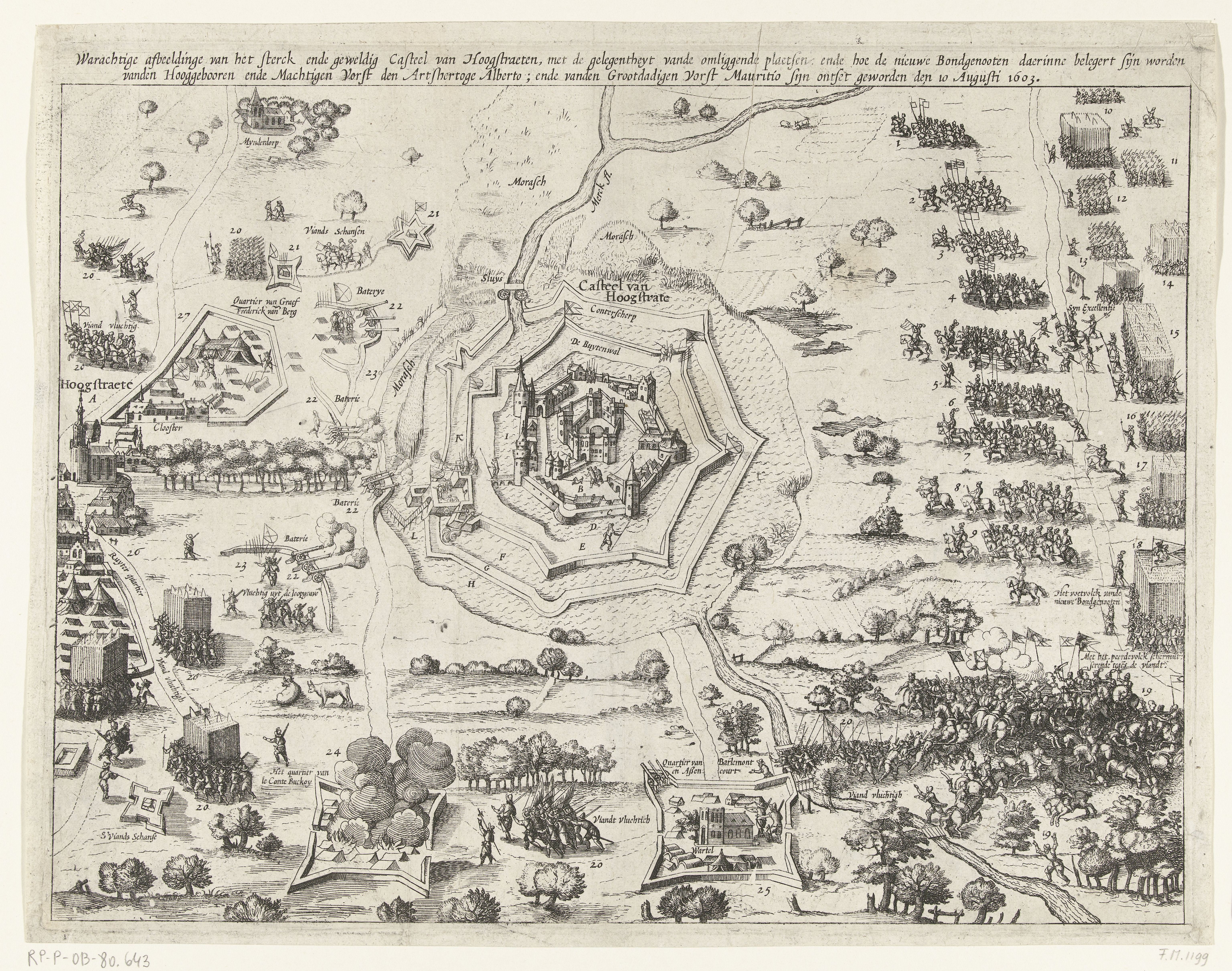
The village and castle of Hoogstraten during the mutiny in 1693, when Maurice, Prince of Orange relieves the Spanish mutineers

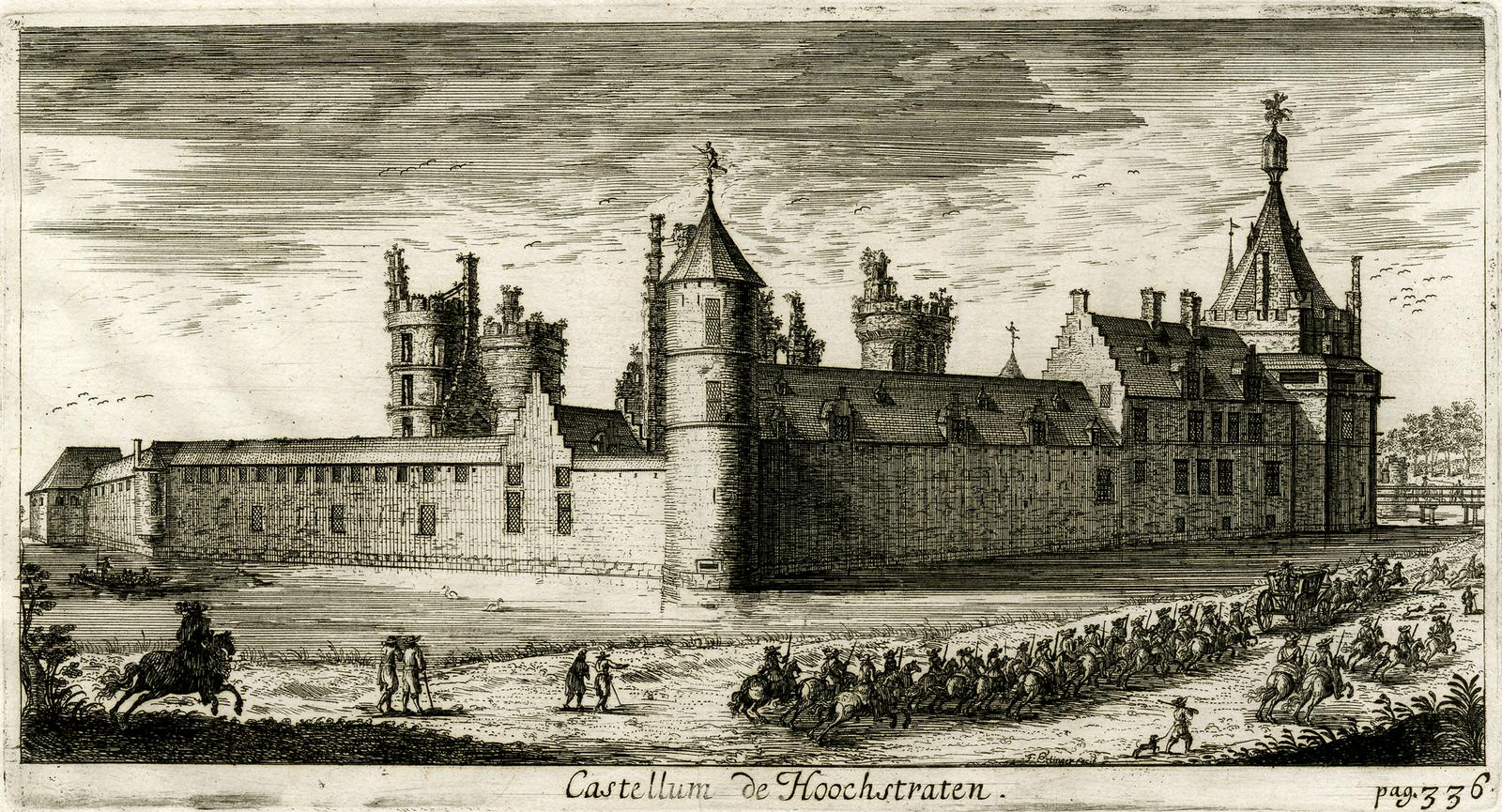
Ertinger's engraving shows the inner castle in ruins (1678)

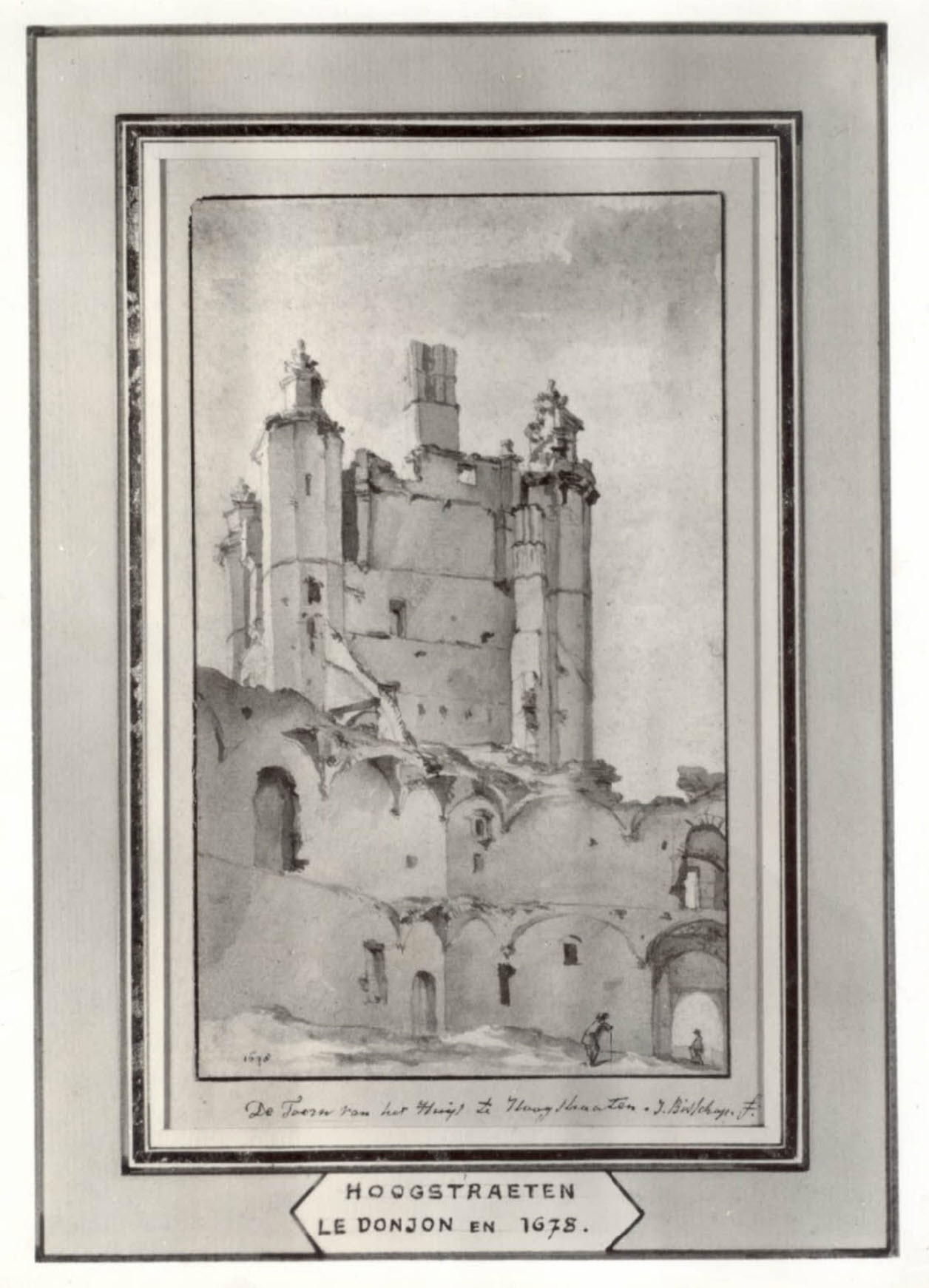
Jan de Bisschop draw the keep in the ruineous inner castle (1678)

=== The Princes of Salm-Salm ===
Maria‑Gabriëlla de Lalaing (1640 – 1709), was the last representative of the Lalaing line that held the County of Hoogstraten as the 9th countess. In 1657, she married Count Charles‑Florentin zu Salm (1638 – 1676), who was killed during the Siege of Maastricht. Their son, William‑Florentin (1670 – 1707), married Maria Anna von Mansfeld (1680 – 1724). When William‑Florentin died two years before his mother, his eight‑year‑old son, Nicholas‑Leopold zu Salm, became heir to Hoogstraten. On Maria‑Gabriëlla's death in 1709 the household inventory revealed a castle reduced to a single great hall and barely ten habitable rooms—no fine furniture, precious artworks, or even fruit trees—prompting her executor, A. M. Van Kessel, to launch immediate repairs and refurnishings.

Nicholas‑Leopold's marriage in 1719 to his distant cousin Dorothea von Salm reunited two branches of the princely house. Under their patronage a tall oak altar dedicated to St John Nepomuk was installed in the castle's north side chapel in 1721 (the altar itself has since vanished, though the statue survives). The couple resided at Hoogstraten intermittently until 1729, gradually restoring a measure of courtly life to the estate. Imperial favour followed: on 6 January 1740 Emperor Charles VI elevated the county to a duchy, making Nikolaus‑Leopold the first Duke of Hoogstraten.

Next to Hoogstraten, the principal residence of the princes of Salm-Salm remained the abbey‑town of Senones in the Vosges until revolutionary forces expelled them in 1793.

A fire in 1729 destroyed the kitchens. Nicholas‑Leopold succeeded his father‑in‑law in 1738, becoming Prince of Salm, Duke in 1740 and Prince of Salm‑Salm in 1743. Also, it added Anholt Castle in Westphalia to his holdings. Bridges were repaired (1743) and new ponds dug (1750). After another blaze (1752) the lower court was refurbished as a hunting lodge. Ambitious plans of 1753‑55 to enlarge and modernise the palace are undocumented, so their execution remains uncertain.

In 1768 a fire gutted the residential core on the inner court; it was never rebuilt. When Prince Maximilian died in 1773 only the armoury and wardrobe are mentioned in the inventory—though the gardens still boasted orange, laurel, myrtle, jasmine and fig trees, and even pineapples. Prince Louis of Salm‑Salm (1770‑78) repaired the roof and a tower; new furniture arrived in 1774 and again after a restoration campaign in 1782. That year, while the minor Prince Constantine was under guardianship, extensive works went ahead against his wishes: the ruined inner castle was demolished, the inner moats likely filled, and a new wing (dated 1782 on its keystone) rose south‑east of the forecourt, serving the last resident duchess, Princess Louise, for about a decade.

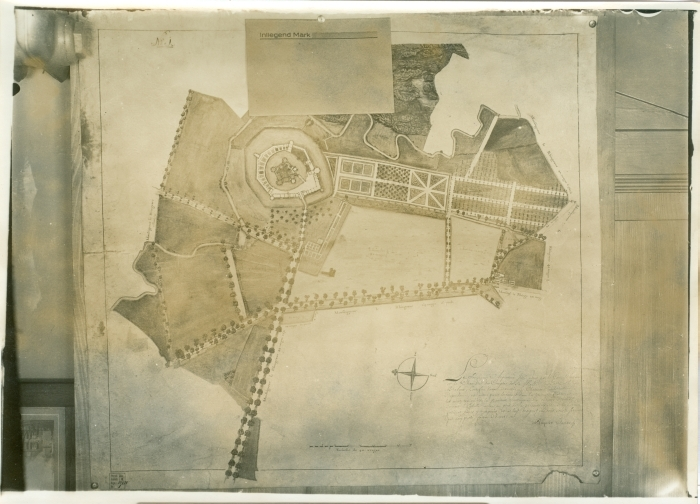
A map of the castle and its direct environment (first half of the 18th century)

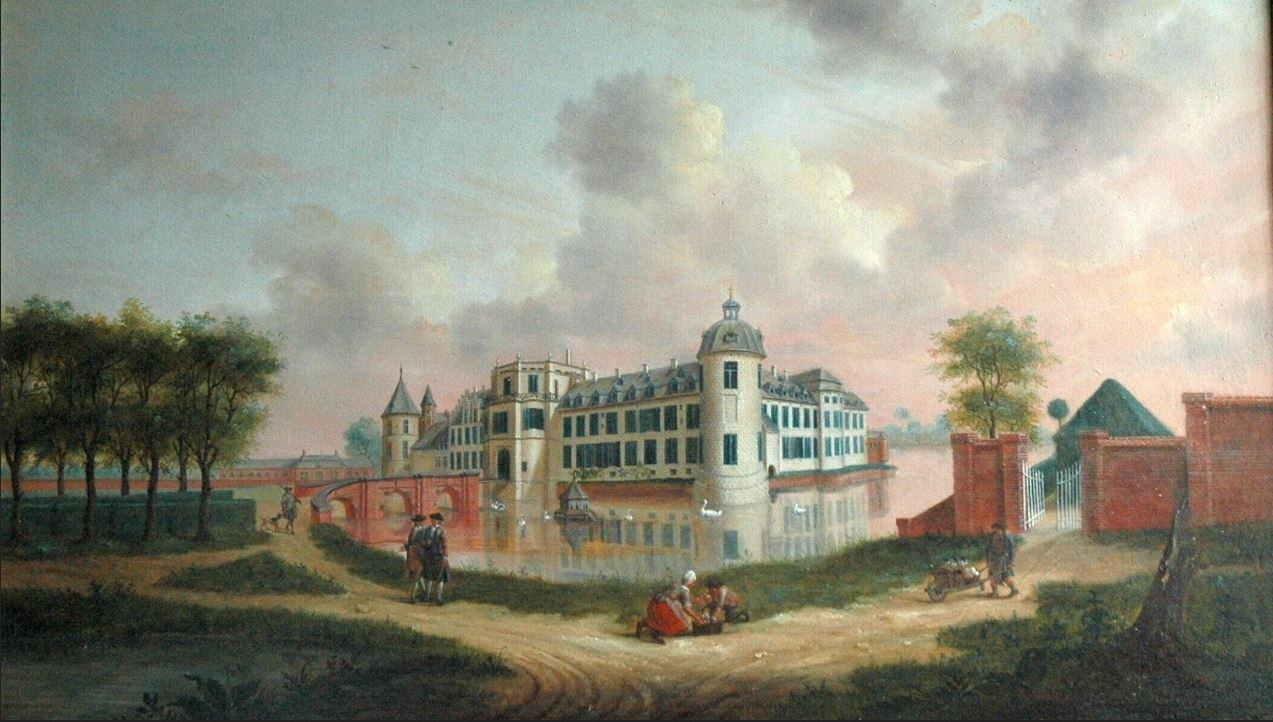
The castle after the renovations by the princes of Salm (2nd half of the 18th century)

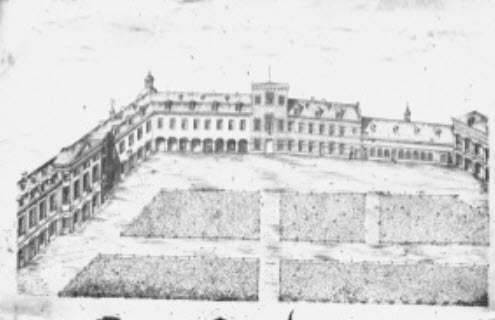
The inner courtyard

=== From Beggars’ Asylum to Penal School ===
The French confiscated the property in 1796, plundered and partly demolished it, then used it as a gendarmerie barracks and a residence for the justice of the peace. King William I lifted the seizure in 1815 and the princely Salm-Salm family regained the estates, but the castle itself remained property of the Dutch state as the buildings were needed for public service or charity. The princely family shifted its main residence to Schloss Anholt in Westphalia, where it still lives.

In 1808, Napoleon created a shelter for beggars. Initially housed in Mechelen, it moved to Hoogstraten castle in 1810. From 1880, the castle was used as an agricultural colony, and, since 1931, has served as a penitentiary education centre—a function it continues to perform today.

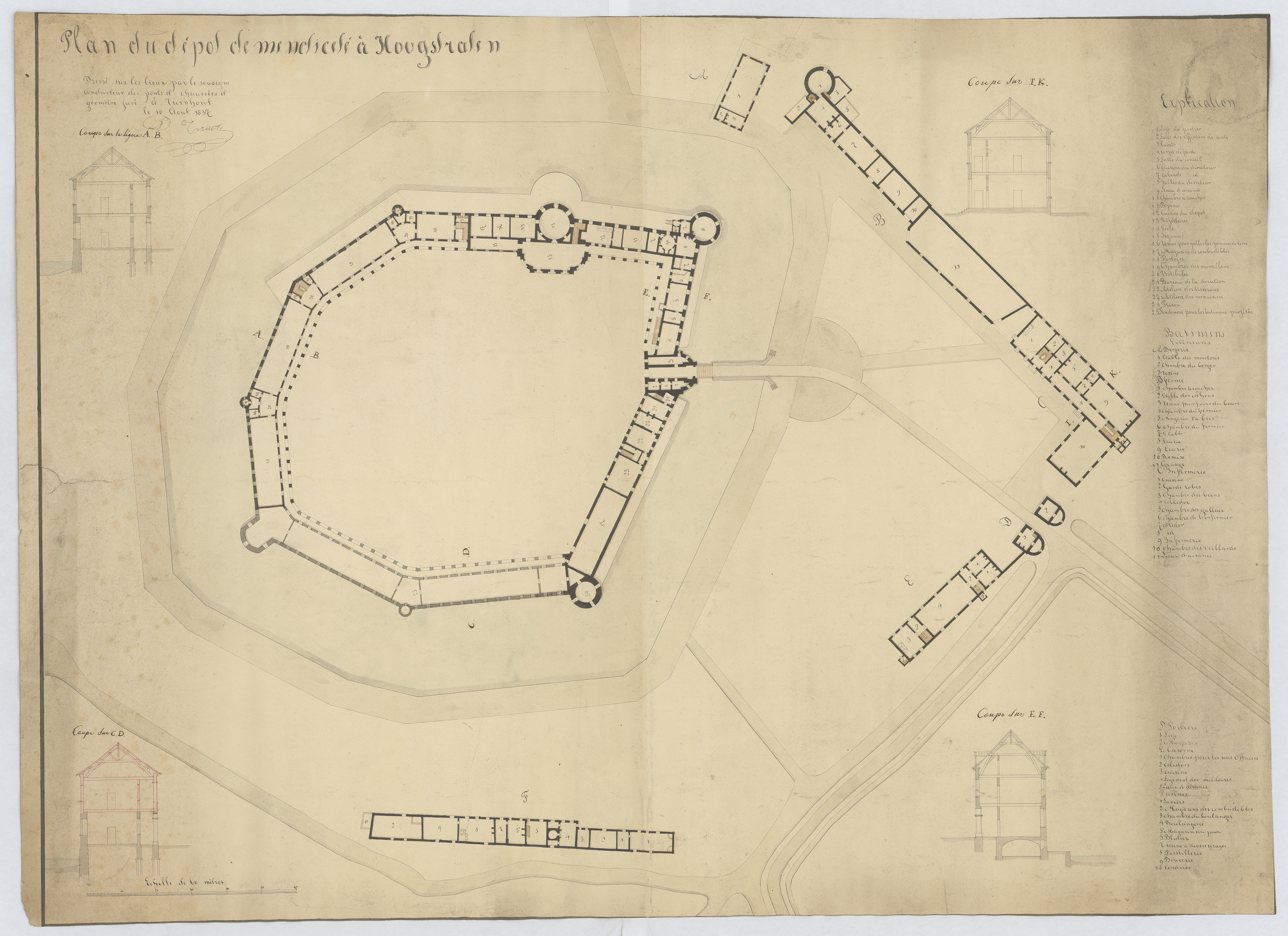
Plan showing Hoogstraten castle after its rebuilding to a shelter for beggars

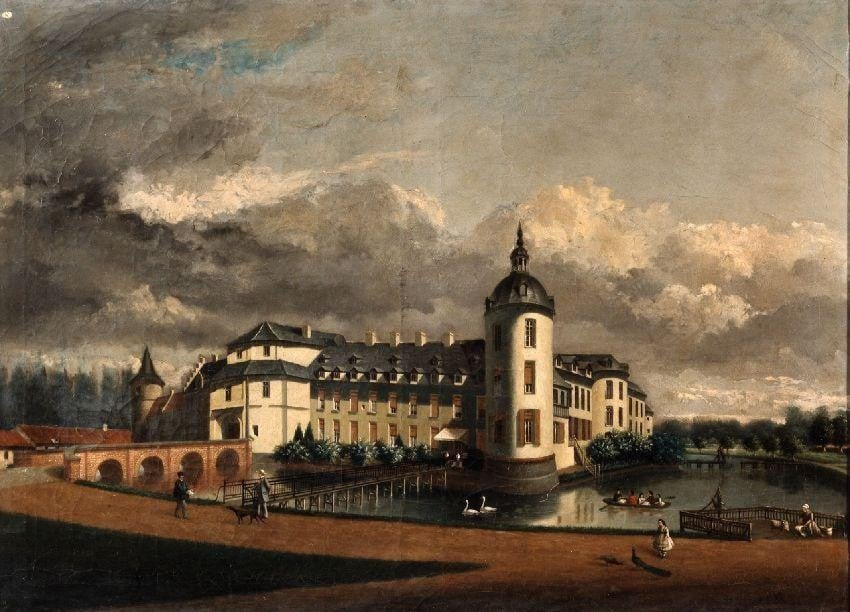
The Gelmelslot in the 19th century

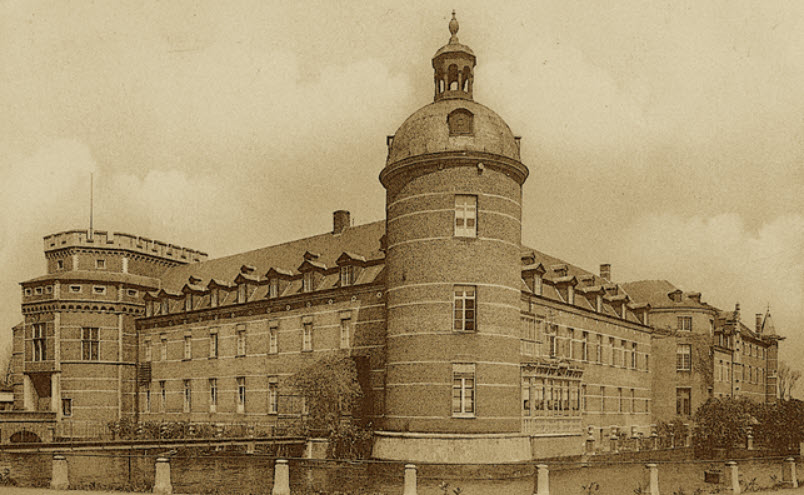
Hoogstraten castle around 1900

== Architecture ==
Little survives of the original 15th century pentagonal moated castle —known as the inner castle—beyond the broad moat (once the second defensive ring) and what are thought to be its buried foundations, later reused for the 16th century reconstruction. The complex that grew atop those footings was the work of Rombout II Keldermans, whose mighty gatehouse, flanking ranges and northern corner tower still define the south west wing; they are clearly recognisable in Frans Ertinger's 1678 engraving.

Over the centuries this ensemble was repeatedly adapted: the northern tower became a dovecote in the 17th century, the former armoury was turned into a chapel in 1845 51, and the paired right hand wing—together with the southern corner tower—was refitted in the 18th century as a residence for the princely Salm Salm family.

Later additions reshaped the castle into the institutional complex we see today. A south east wing (now the visitors’ hall) was raised in the late 18th century, and around 1810 two vast cell block wings to the north east and north west were erected, reportedly modelled on Paris's Hôtel des Invalides . The gatehouse acquired its present 19th century façade, while the forecourt service quarters, farm buildings and workshops—first laid out circa 1810—have been enlarged or altered many times since. Together these densely layered structures chart Hoogstraten's evolution from late medieval stronghold to a modern penitentiary.

== Literature ==
- Lauwerys, S (1978). "Het kasteel van Hoogstraten I". Jaarboek van Koninklijk Hoogstraatse Oudheidkundige Kring 1978 (in Dutch). Hoogstraten: Koninklijk Hoogstraatse Oudheidkundige Kring.
- Lauwerys, S (1979). "Het kasteel van Hoogstraten II". Jaarboek van Koninklijk Hoogstraatse Oudheidkundige Kring 1979 (in Dutch). Hoogstraten: Koninklijk Hoogstraatse Oudheidkundige Kring.
- Lauwerys, S (1980). "Het kasteel van Hoogstraten III". Jaarboek van Koninklijk Hoogstraatse Oudheidkundige Kring 1980 (in Dutch). Hoogstraten: Koninklijk Hoogstraatse Oudheidkundige Kring.
- Mijnhardt, Wijnand W. (2024). Het Verdriet van Elisabeth van Culemborg (in Dutch). Amsterdam: Uitgeverij Prometheus. p. 312. ISBN 978-9044658293.
