= Everdingen =

- Village
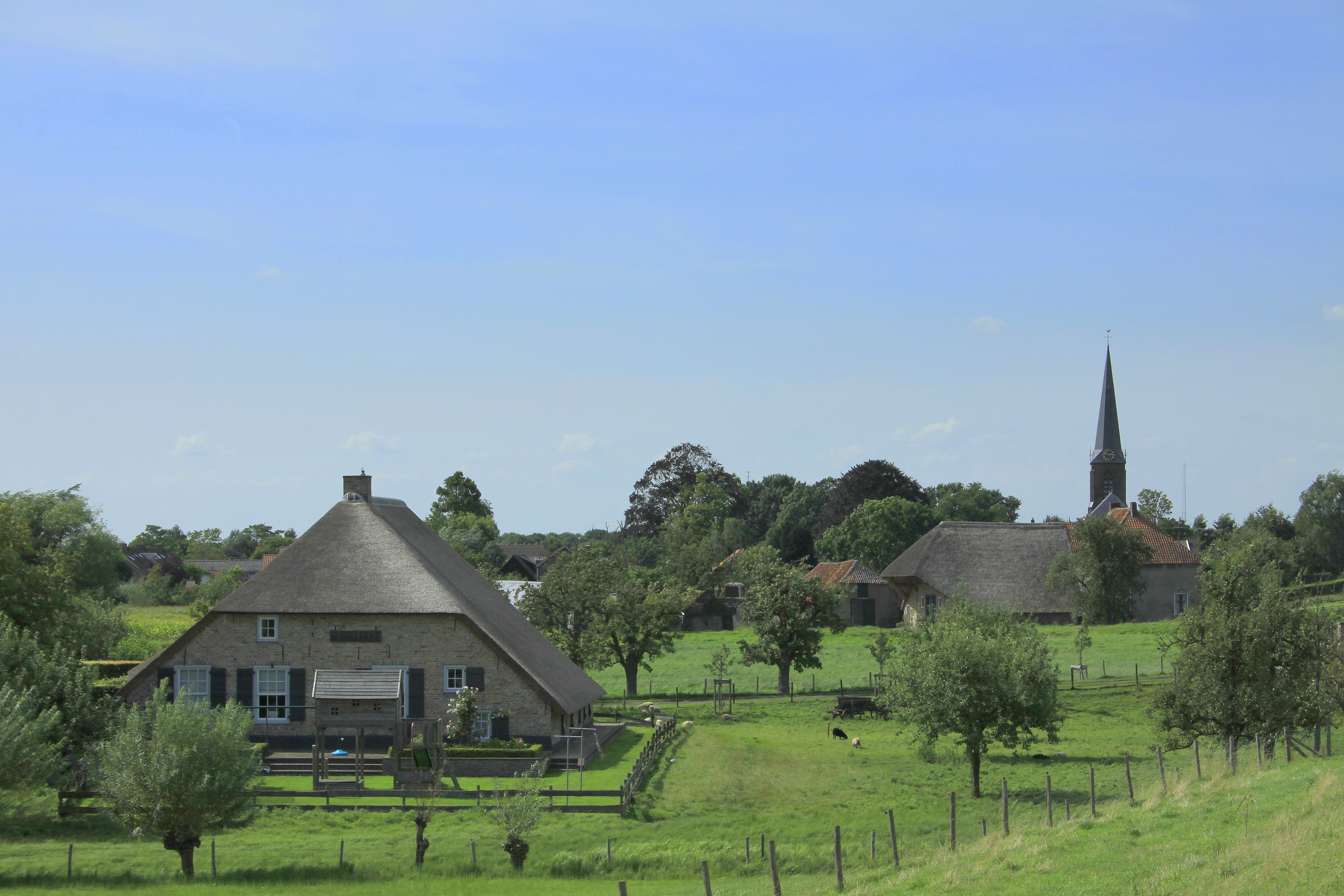
- View on Everdingen

- Location in the Netherlands Everdingen (Netherlands)
- Coordinates: 51°57′53″N 5°9′23″E
- Country: Netherlands
- Province: Utrecht
- Municipality: Vijfheerenlanden

Area
  - Total: 7.70 km^{2} (2.97 sq mi)
- Elevation: 3 m (9.8 ft)

Population (2021)
  - Total: 1,200
  - Density: 160/km^{2} (400/sq mi)
- Time zone: UTC+1 (CET)
  - Summer (DST): UTC+2 (CEST)
- Postal code: 4121
- Dialing code: 0347

Everdingen is a former municipality in the Netherlands. Together with Zijderveld and Hagestein, it was part of Vianen municipality from 1986 to 2018. Since 2019 it has been part of the municipality of Vijfheerenlanden. It enjoys a strategic position on the Lekdijk to the south of the river Lek. The eastern limits of Everdingen are marked by the Diefdijk, which also marks the municipal and provincial boundaries. Fort Everdingen was built nearby during the 19th century as a part of the Hollandse Waterlinie.

Everdingen was originally a town in the province of Gelderland but the borders were redrawn in 1820 making it a part of South Holland. It transferred from that province when it came under the municipality of Vianen. It is now in the province of Utrecht.

Everdingen was mentioned as early as 1284 when the big landowners of the area were invited by the Lord of Everdingen to discuss and agree to the maintenance of the dikes.

These days Everdingen is mostly known from traffic information because of the nearby motorway intersection and bottleneck on the motorways A2 and A27.

== Gallery ==
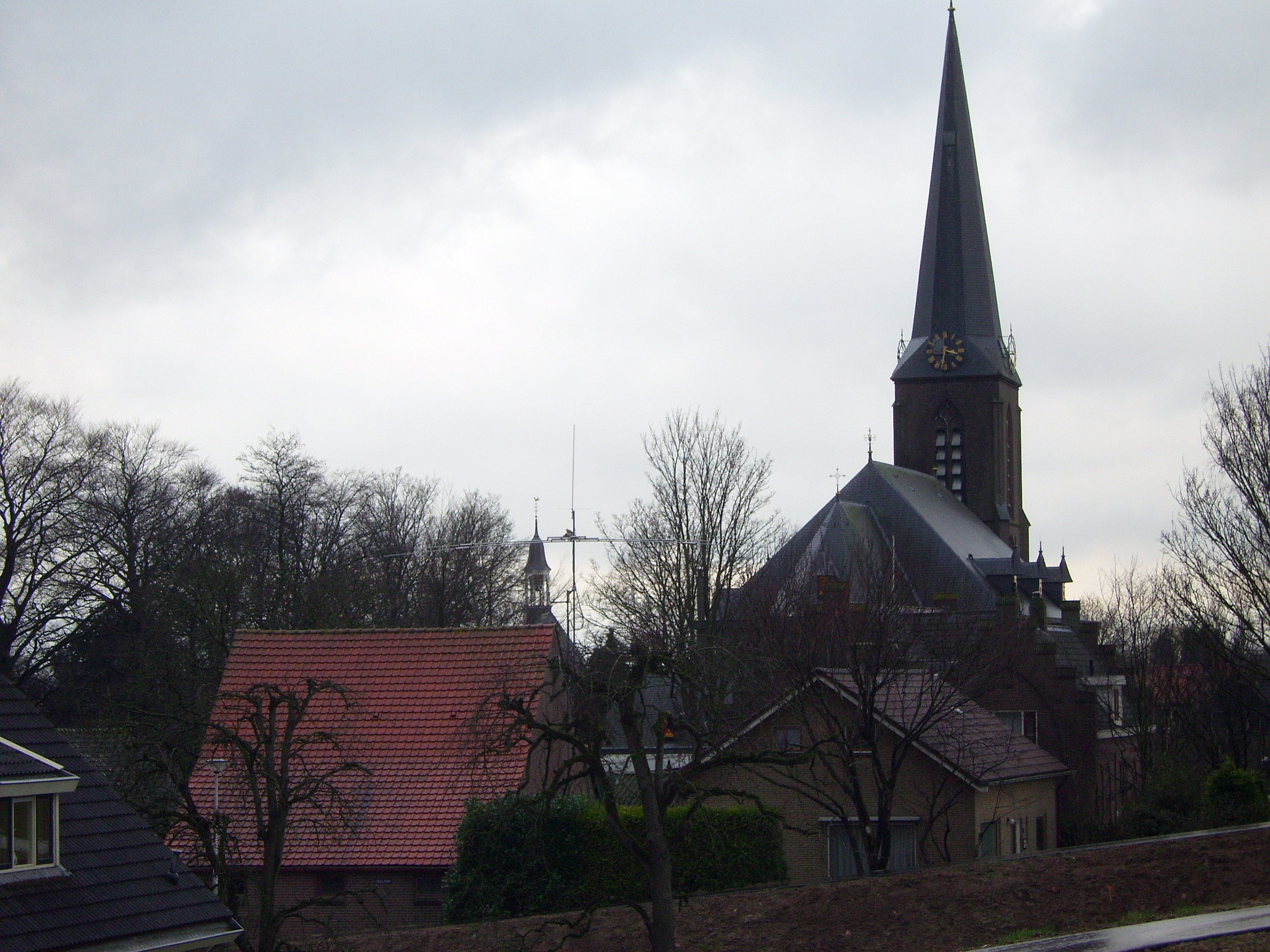
Church of Everdingen

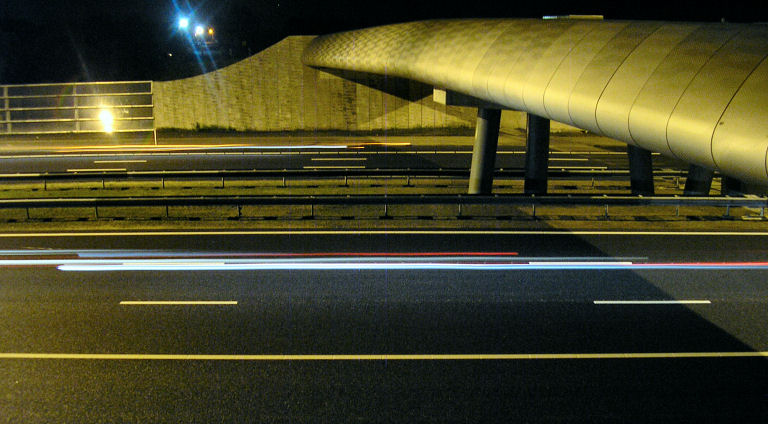
Coupure of the dike at the A2 motorway

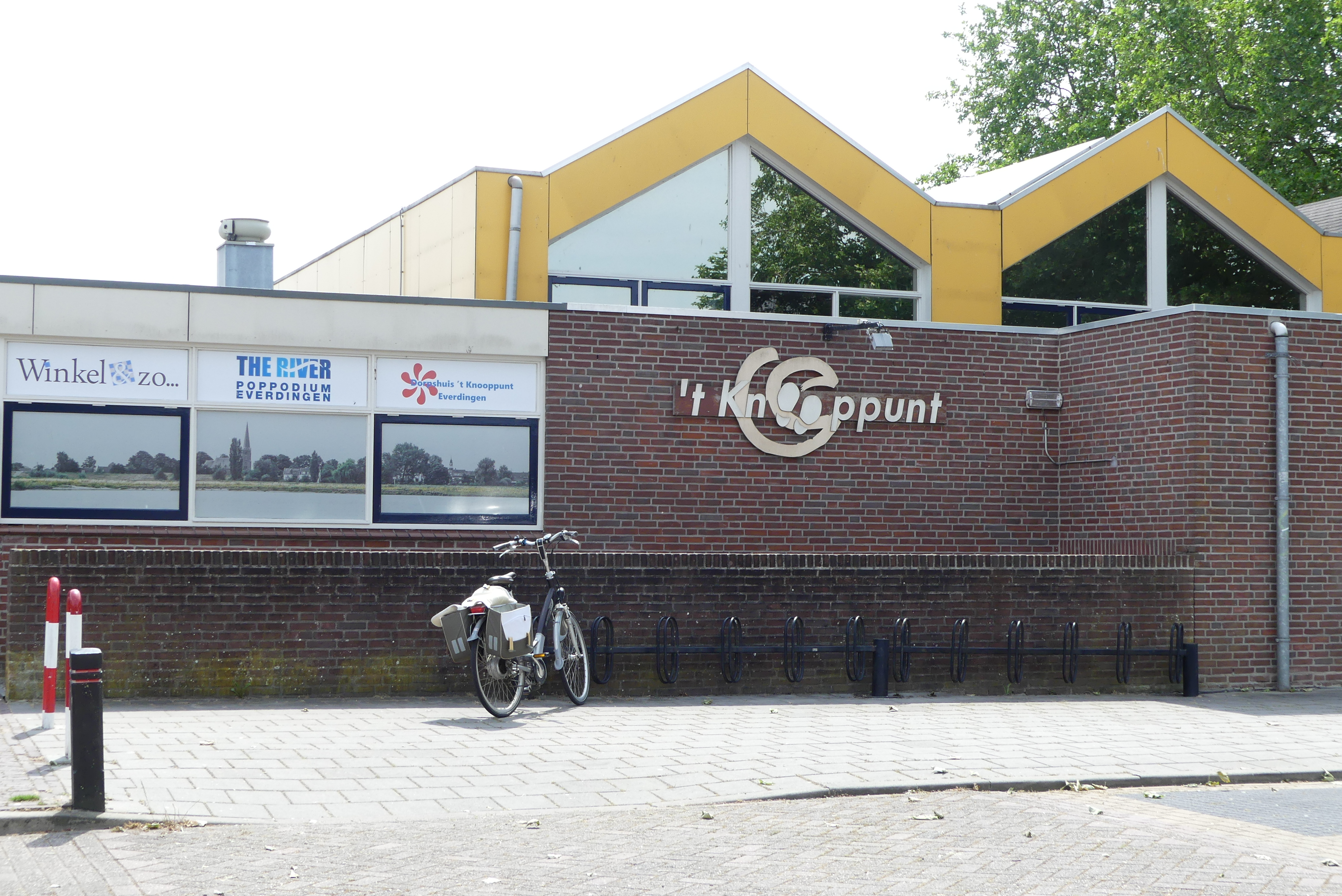
Village house

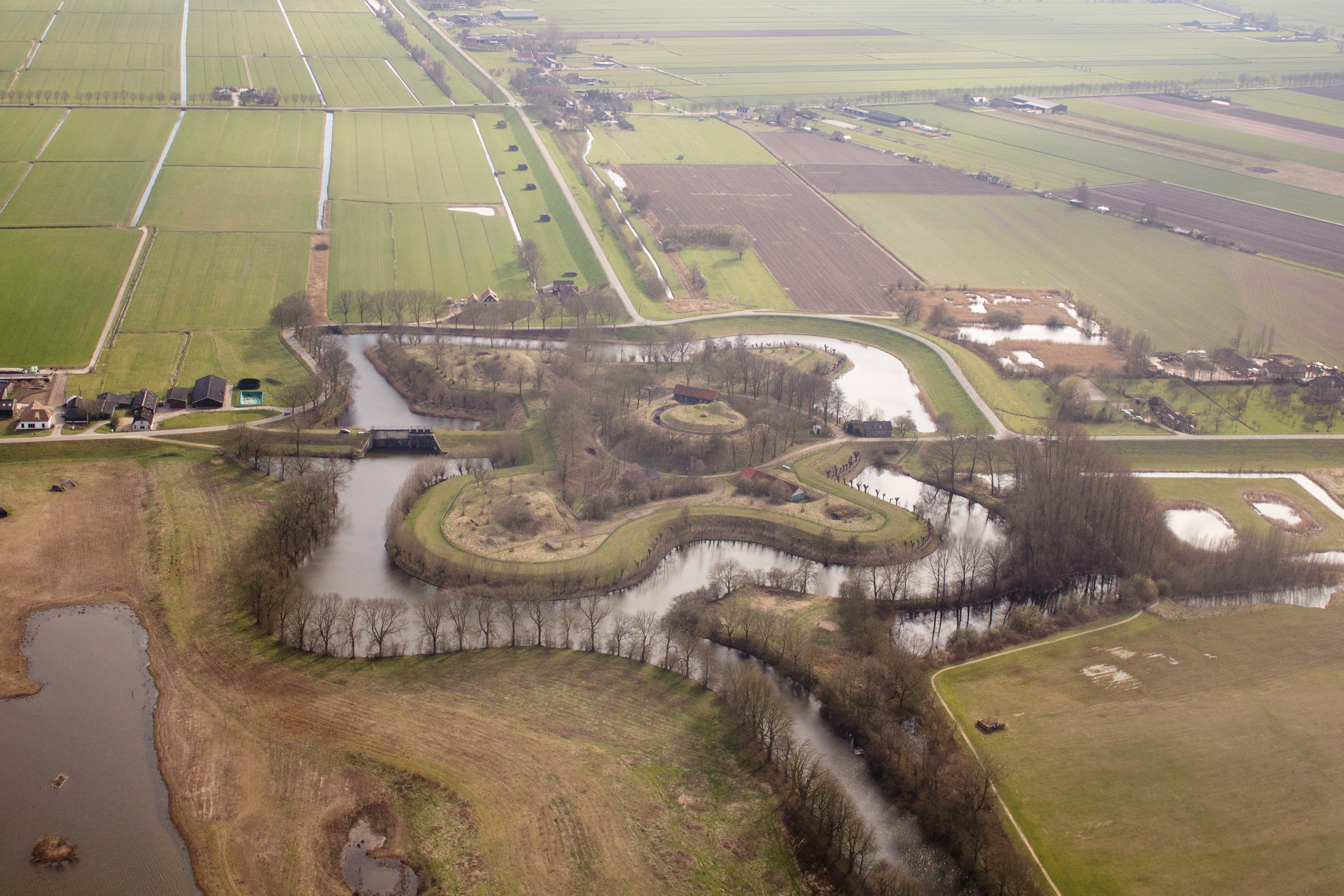
Fort Everdingen
