= Elisabeth of Culemborg =

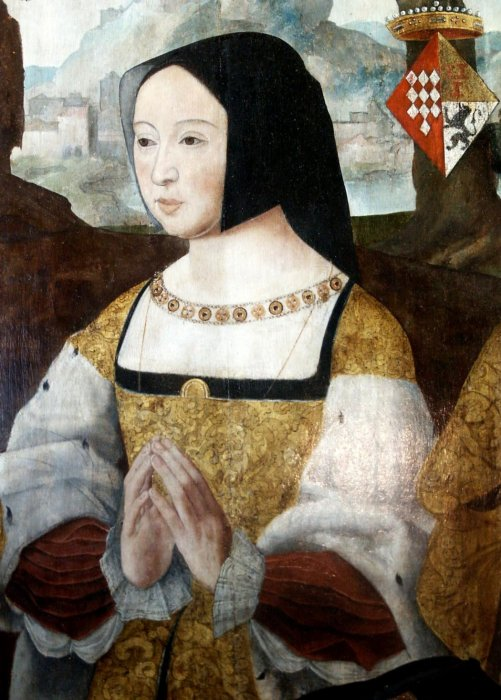
Elisabeth of Culemborg

Culemborg coat of arms

Elisabeth of Culemborg (30 March 1475, the former slot of Hoogstraten - 9 December 1555, Culemborg), nicknamed 'Lady Elizabeth' ('Vrouwe Elisabeth') was the last sovereign lord or lady of the fiefdom of Culemborg (promoted to a county by Charles V, Holy Roman Emperor shortly before her death), from 1504 until 1555. She was also the dame d'honneur of Archduchess Margaret of Austria.

== Life ==
She was the heiress of jonker Jasper of Culemborg and Joanna of Burgundy. In 1501 Elisabeth married Jean de Luxembourg-Ville († 1508), who died in 1508. She remarried in 1509 to Antoine I de Lalaing, later acting-governor of the Netherlands. She had no children.

She served as maid of honour Joan I of Castile from 1496 to her marriage, and was appointed dame d'honneur to her sister-in-law Archduchess Margaret of Austria in 1506. She spent a great deal of her life at the court of the Netherlands, where she was an important and leading figure.

In parallel, she ruled in her domains, where she was known for her appreciation of arts and architecture as well as for the seminary (from 1532 a retirement home) she founded in 1520. She was also known as a pious Catholic and opposition toward the Protestant reformation, issued repression of "heretic" books, such as the work of Erasmus, and allowed the Jesuits to establish in Culemborg.

After the death of her second spouse, she retired permanently to rule Culemborg.

== Sources ==
- Website van het Penitentiair Schoolcentrum Hoogstraten
- Website Mens & Dier in Steen & Brons
- Peter G. Bietenholz & Thomas Brian Deutscher: Contemporaries of Erasmus: A Biographical Register of the Renaissance and Reformation. Volym 1–3
