= Zijderveld =

- Village
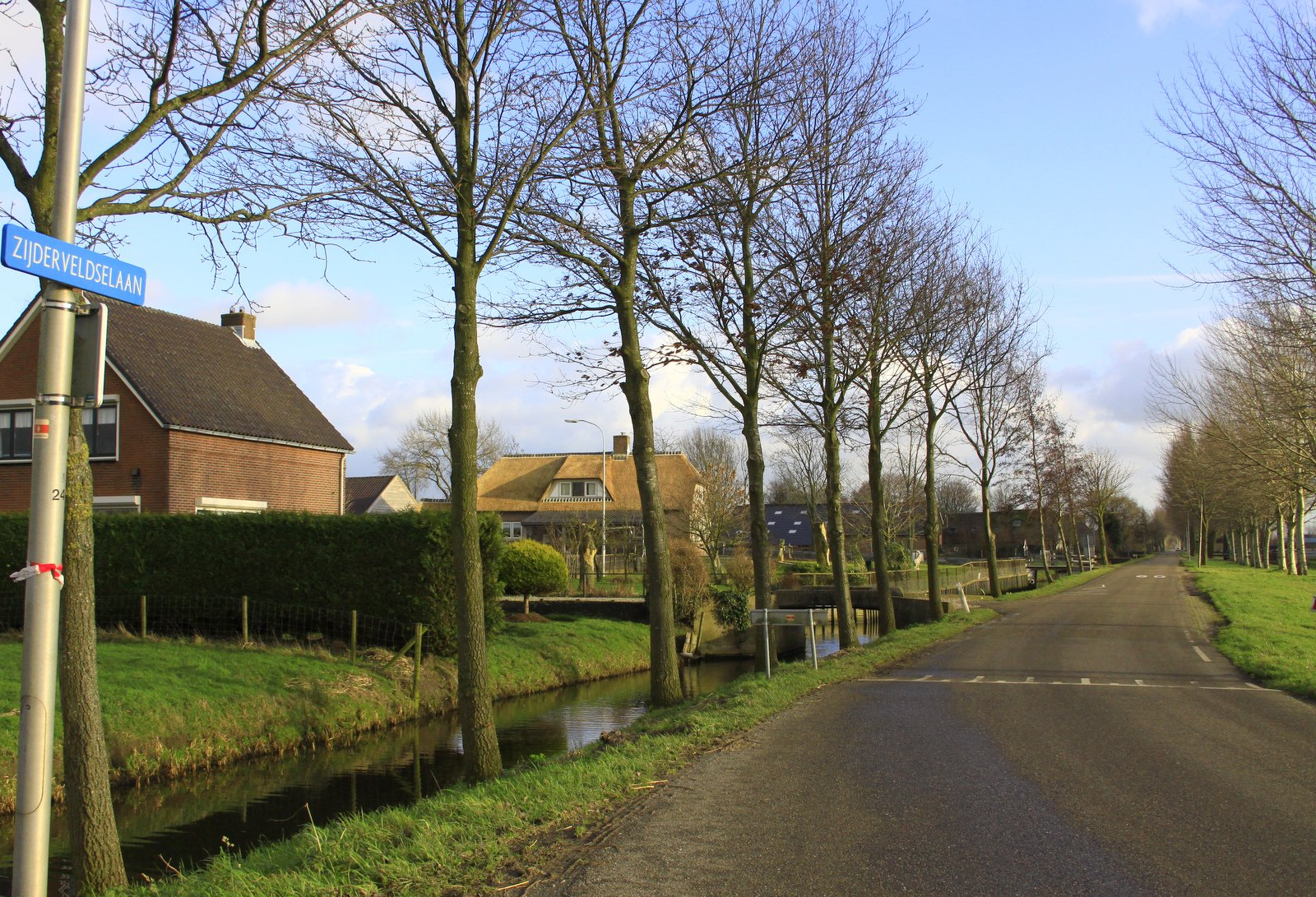
- Street view

- Flag

- Location in the Netherlands Zijderveld (Netherlands)
- Coordinates: 51°56′31″N 5°8′22″E
- Country: Netherlands
- Province: Utrecht
- Municipality: Vijfheerenlanden

Area
  - Total: 4.96 km^{2} (1.92 sq mi)
- Elevation: 1 m (3.3 ft)

Population (2021)
  - Total: 870
  - Density: 180/km^{2} (450/sq mi)
- Time zone: UTC+1 (CET)
  - Summer (DST): UTC+2 (CEST)
- Postal code: 4122
- Dialing code: 0345
- Major roads: A2, N484

Zijderveld is a village in the Dutch province of Utrecht (province). It is located approximately 6 km northeast of Leerdam within the municipality of Vijfheerenlanden.

The village, initially referenced as Zijtwendervelt in 1282, derives its name from the Dutch expression for "field at a sideways dike". The Dutch Reformed Church, dating back to the 15th century, was rebuilt in 1830. In 1840, the village had a population of 532.

== Gallery ==
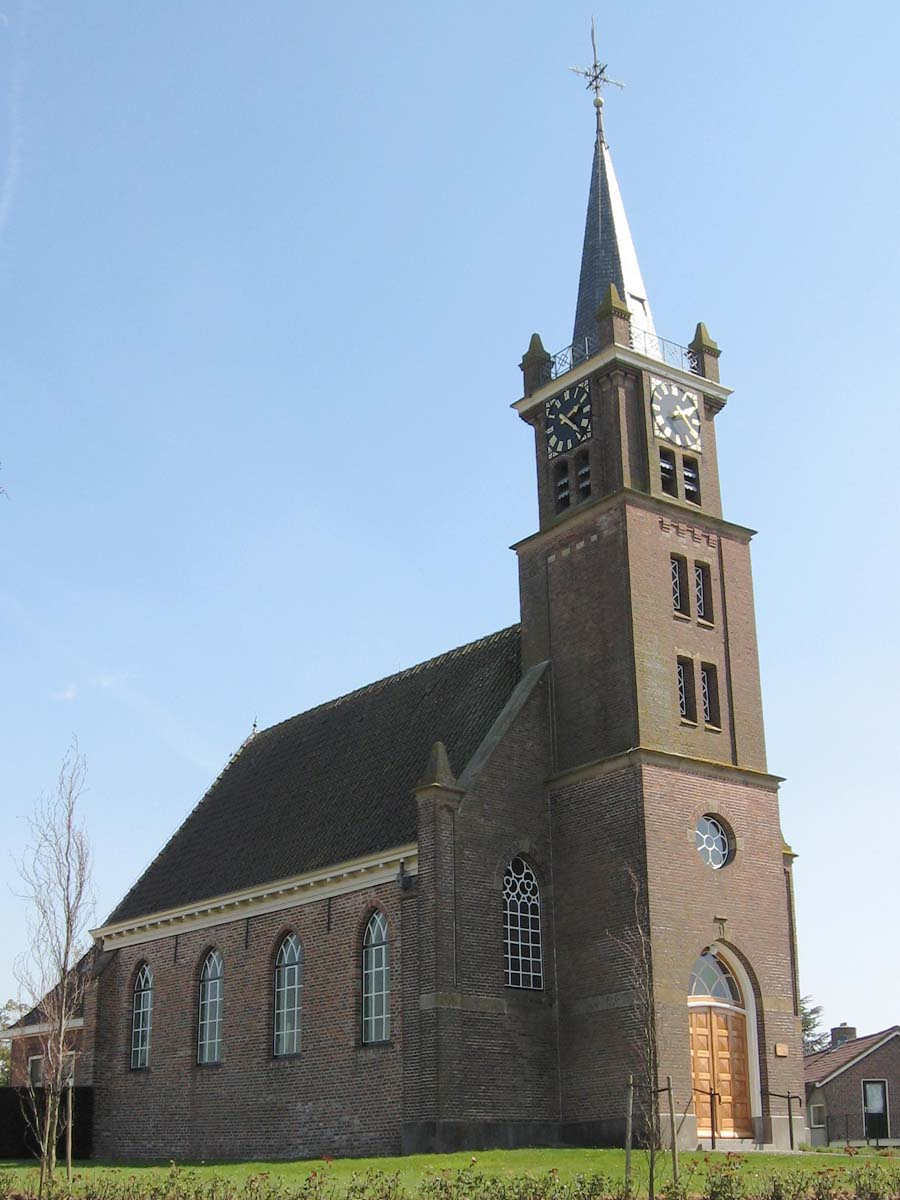
Church in Zijderveld

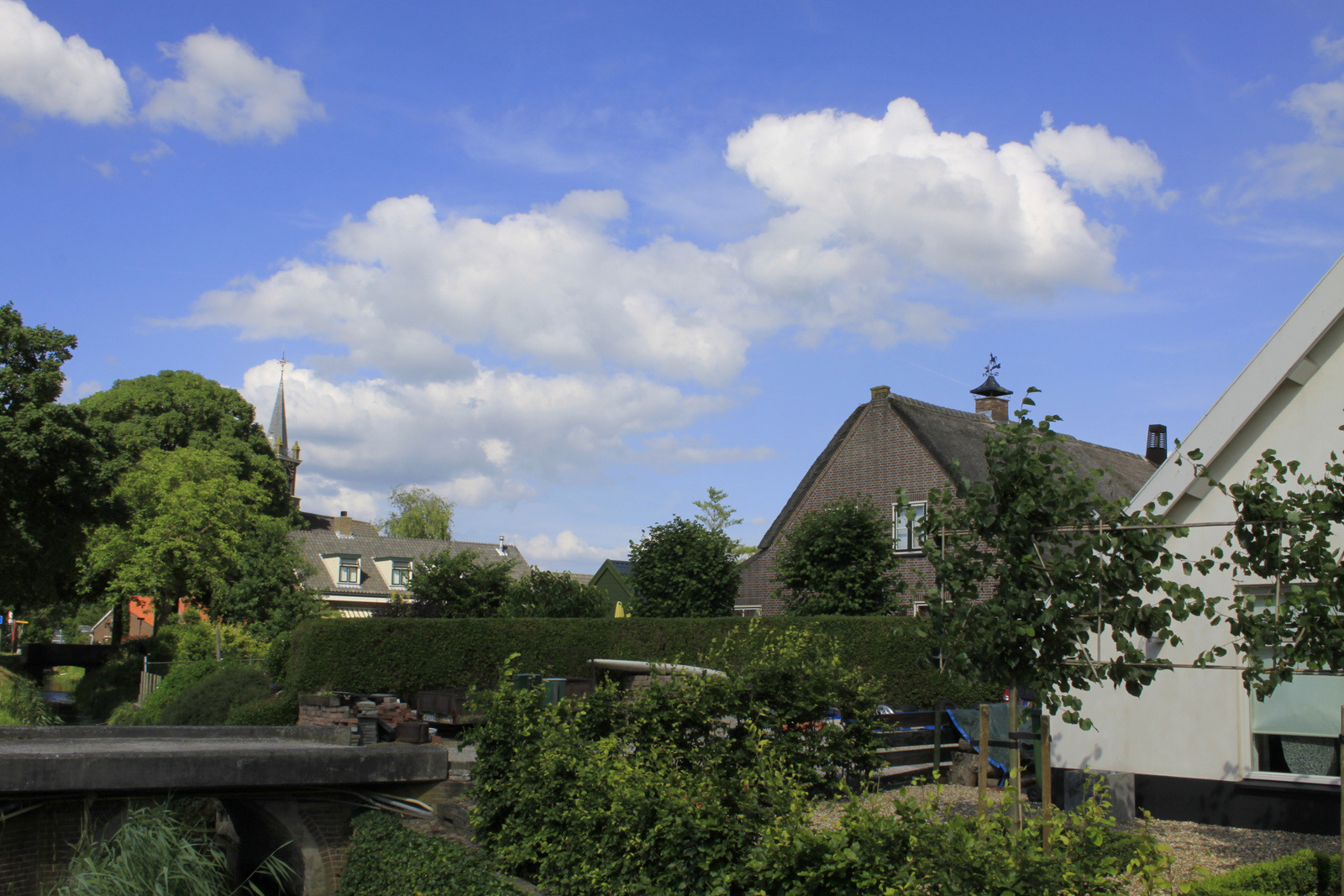

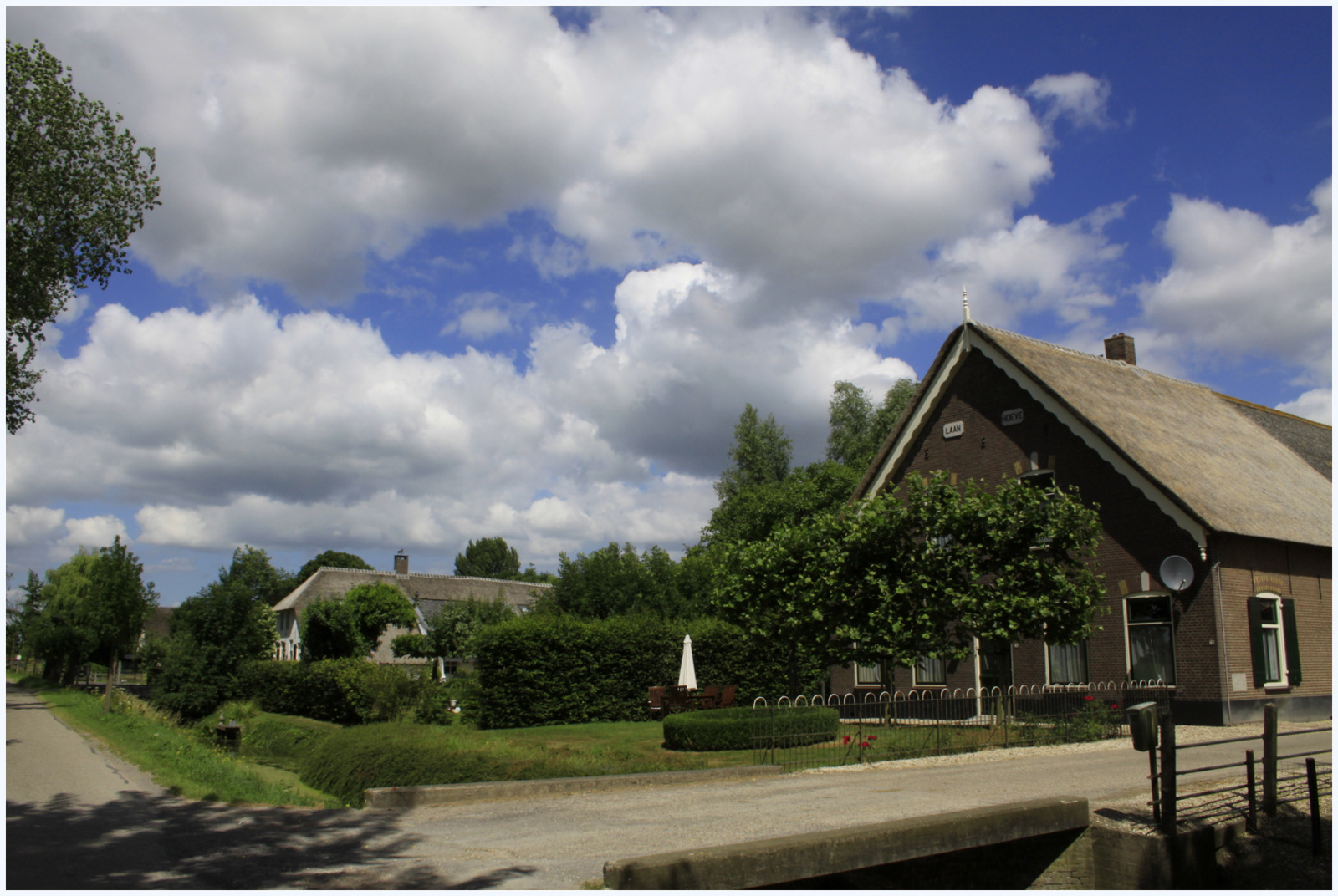
Farm in Zijderveld
