= Antoine of Lalaing, 1st Count of Hoogstraeten =

General and 1st count of Hoogstraten and of Culemborg

Antoine de Lalaing 1st Count of Hoogstraeten
- Lalaing coat of arms
- Born: 1480
- Died: 1540 (aged 59–60)
- Noble family: House of Lalaing
- Spouse: Elisabeth van Culemborg
- Father: Joost de Lalaing
- Mother: Bonne de La Viefville

Antoine I de Lalaing (1480–1540), 1st count of Hoogstraten and of Culemborg, was a Hainautese nobleman who held various offices in the court of the Dukes of Burgundy.

== Life ==
De Lalaing was a son of Joost de Lalaing and Bonne van Viefville. He married Elisabeth van Culemborg, first lady-in-waiting to Margaret of Austria, still exists in the choir of the church if St.Catherine at Hoogstraten. It was from her that De Lalaing inherited the titles of Hoogstraten and Culemborg. The marriage remained childless.

In 1501 he was chamberlain at the court of Philip the Handsome. Later, in 1510, he was Counsellor and Chamberlain to the young Charles of Luxemburg, later emperor Charles V. The Prints Cabinet of the Royal Library owns a series of six bistre-coloured ink drawings glued edge to edge representing the plan for the funeral of a knight of the Golden Fleece identified as Antoine de Lalaing (1480-1510).

Also in 1510 he also became a member of the Great Council of Mechelen. In 1516 he was elected a knight of the Order of the Golden Fleece, then in 1522 appointed stadhouder of Holland, Zeeland and West-Friesland. In 1528 he also became stadhouder of the Sticht Utrecht.

Antoine was also a general, playing an important part in the Burgundian dukes' struggle against Charles, Duke of Guelders and his attempts to conquer the Sticht. He was also a convinced Catholic and fought hard against the Protestantism then on the rise, commissioning the Sint-Catharinakerk in Hoogstraten. The paper, with contemporary and almost illegible handwritten notes above the drawings, can he dated to c.1531-1515, the white marble tomb of the Lalaing consorts, with the gisants of Antoine - from the 16th century, the free-standing statues of sibyls which decorated the base of the tomb. Just as in Erwin Hensler (1923) and Saintenoy (1931).

The health problems of Archduchess Margaret of Austria meant that in 1530 Antoine became acting governor of the Netherlands, with Charles V appointing his sister Mary of Austria as his successor in this last year of Antoine's life.

This is known from these descriptions. As a result of historical circumstances, the funeral as represented on the drawings never took place.

The author adduces proofs to argue that the cenotaph can belie attributable to J(e)an Mone, born at Metz around 1480, who worked for the Brussels court and also produced the tomb of Antoine de Lalaing's elder brother Charles I, which was destroyed at Douai in 1910. Mono is mentioned in the Hoogstraten archives as "Jan lartist" or even "Jan Moeet".

== Sources ==
- ter Braake, Serge (2007). Met recht en rekenschap: de ambtenaren bij het Hof van Holland en de Haagse Rekenkamer in de Habsburgse tijd (1483-1558) [With law and accountability: the civil servants at the Court of Holland and the Court of Audit in The Hague in the Habsburg era (1483-1558)] (Thesis) (in Dutch). Uitgeverij Verloren. hdl:1887/12449. ISBN 978-90-8704-010-9.
- Hans Cools, Mannen met macht, Edellieden en de Moderne Staat in de Bourgondisch-Habsburgse landen (1475-1530). Walburg Pers, Zutphen, 2001. ISBN 90-6011-625-9 (in Dutch)
- (in Dutch) Hanno Wijsman, Gebonden Weelde. Productie van geïllustreerde handschriften en adellijk boekenbezit in de Bourgondische Nederlanden (1400-1550) (Proefschrift Leiden 2003)
